

187001–187100 

|-bgcolor=#d6d6d6
| 187001 ||  || — || October 7, 2004 || Socorro || LINEAR || — || align=right | 4.8 km || 
|-id=002 bgcolor=#fefefe
| 187002 ||  || — || October 7, 2004 || Socorro || LINEAR || H || align=right | 1.0 km || 
|-id=003 bgcolor=#d6d6d6
| 187003 ||  || — || October 6, 2004 || Palomar || NEAT || 3:2 || align=right | 9.4 km || 
|-id=004 bgcolor=#d6d6d6
| 187004 ||  || — || October 7, 2004 || Anderson Mesa || LONEOS || — || align=right | 4.5 km || 
|-id=005 bgcolor=#d6d6d6
| 187005 ||  || — || October 7, 2004 || Socorro || LINEAR || — || align=right | 3.8 km || 
|-id=006 bgcolor=#d6d6d6
| 187006 ||  || — || October 7, 2004 || Socorro || LINEAR || — || align=right | 5.1 km || 
|-id=007 bgcolor=#d6d6d6
| 187007 ||  || — || October 7, 2004 || Socorro || LINEAR || — || align=right | 3.9 km || 
|-id=008 bgcolor=#d6d6d6
| 187008 ||  || — || October 7, 2004 || Socorro || LINEAR || — || align=right | 7.1 km || 
|-id=009 bgcolor=#d6d6d6
| 187009 ||  || — || October 8, 2004 || Anderson Mesa || LONEOS || — || align=right | 3.6 km || 
|-id=010 bgcolor=#d6d6d6
| 187010 ||  || — || October 7, 2004 || Socorro || LINEAR || HYG || align=right | 4.6 km || 
|-id=011 bgcolor=#d6d6d6
| 187011 ||  || — || October 8, 2004 || Kitt Peak || Spacewatch || SHU3:2 || align=right | 6.1 km || 
|-id=012 bgcolor=#d6d6d6
| 187012 ||  || — || October 8, 2004 || Kitt Peak || Spacewatch || 3:2 || align=right | 5.3 km || 
|-id=013 bgcolor=#d6d6d6
| 187013 ||  || — || October 7, 2004 || Socorro || LINEAR || THM || align=right | 3.3 km || 
|-id=014 bgcolor=#d6d6d6
| 187014 ||  || — || October 10, 2004 || Kitt Peak || Spacewatch || HYG || align=right | 4.7 km || 
|-id=015 bgcolor=#d6d6d6
| 187015 ||  || — || October 18, 2004 || Socorro || LINEAR || EOS || align=right | 3.5 km || 
|-id=016 bgcolor=#d6d6d6
| 187016 ||  || — || October 18, 2004 || Socorro || LINEAR || — || align=right | 6.0 km || 
|-id=017 bgcolor=#d6d6d6
| 187017 ||  || — || November 3, 2004 || Kitt Peak || Spacewatch || 3:2 || align=right | 7.6 km || 
|-id=018 bgcolor=#C2FFFF
| 187018 ||  || — || December 18, 2004 || Mount Lemmon || Mount Lemmon Survey || L5 || align=right | 10 km || 
|-id=019 bgcolor=#C2FFFF
| 187019 ||  || — || December 20, 2004 || Mount Lemmon || Mount Lemmon Survey || L5 || align=right | 15 km || 
|-id=020 bgcolor=#C2FFFF
| 187020 ||  || — || January 13, 2005 || Kitt Peak || Spacewatch || L5 || align=right | 10 km || 
|-id=021 bgcolor=#C2FFFF
| 187021 ||  || — || January 13, 2005 || Kitt Peak || Spacewatch || L5 || align=right | 13 km || 
|-id=022 bgcolor=#fefefe
| 187022 ||  || — || January 16, 2005 || Socorro || LINEAR || H || align=right | 1.1 km || 
|-id=023 bgcolor=#fefefe
| 187023 ||  || — || January 16, 2005 || Socorro || LINEAR || H || align=right | 1.0 km || 
|-id=024 bgcolor=#C2FFFF
| 187024 ||  || — || January 17, 2005 || Kitt Peak || Spacewatch || L5 || align=right | 14 km || 
|-id=025 bgcolor=#fefefe
| 187025 ||  || — || February 28, 2005 || Socorro || LINEAR || H || align=right data-sort-value="0.92" | 920 m || 
|-id=026 bgcolor=#FFC2E0
| 187026 ||  || — || March 8, 2005 || Socorro || LINEAR || ATE +1km || align=right | 1.2 km || 
|-id=027 bgcolor=#fefefe
| 187027 ||  || — || March 8, 2005 || Anderson Mesa || LONEOS || FLO || align=right | 1.0 km || 
|-id=028 bgcolor=#fefefe
| 187028 ||  || — || March 10, 2005 || Kitt Peak || Spacewatch || V || align=right data-sort-value="0.85" | 850 m || 
|-id=029 bgcolor=#fefefe
| 187029 ||  || — || March 9, 2005 || Mount Lemmon || Mount Lemmon Survey || — || align=right | 1.1 km || 
|-id=030 bgcolor=#fefefe
| 187030 ||  || — || March 13, 2005 || Catalina || CSS || V || align=right | 1.1 km || 
|-id=031 bgcolor=#fefefe
| 187031 ||  || — || March 13, 2005 || Catalina || CSS || H || align=right | 1.2 km || 
|-id=032 bgcolor=#fefefe
| 187032 ||  || — || April 4, 2005 || Catalina || CSS || — || align=right | 1.1 km || 
|-id=033 bgcolor=#fefefe
| 187033 ||  || — || April 2, 2005 || Anderson Mesa || LONEOS || H || align=right data-sort-value="0.82" | 820 m || 
|-id=034 bgcolor=#fefefe
| 187034 ||  || — || April 5, 2005 || Catalina || CSS || H || align=right data-sort-value="0.92" | 920 m || 
|-id=035 bgcolor=#fefefe
| 187035 ||  || — || May 3, 2005 || Kitt Peak || Spacewatch || — || align=right | 1.1 km || 
|-id=036 bgcolor=#fefefe
| 187036 ||  || — || May 3, 2005 || Kitt Peak || Spacewatch || — || align=right | 1.2 km || 
|-id=037 bgcolor=#fefefe
| 187037 ||  || — || May 8, 2005 || Socorro || LINEAR || — || align=right | 1.1 km || 
|-id=038 bgcolor=#fefefe
| 187038 ||  || — || May 8, 2005 || Kitt Peak || Spacewatch || — || align=right | 1.2 km || 
|-id=039 bgcolor=#fefefe
| 187039 ||  || — || May 11, 2005 || Mount Lemmon || Mount Lemmon Survey || — || align=right | 1.1 km || 
|-id=040 bgcolor=#FFC2E0
| 187040 ||  || — || May 14, 2005 || Socorro || LINEAR || APOPHA || align=right data-sort-value="0.43" | 430 m || 
|-id=041 bgcolor=#FA8072
| 187041 ||  || — || May 12, 2005 || Socorro || LINEAR || — || align=right | 1.0 km || 
|-id=042 bgcolor=#fefefe
| 187042 ||  || — || May 16, 2005 || Palomar || NEAT || — || align=right | 1.2 km || 
|-id=043 bgcolor=#FA8072
| 187043 ||  || — || May 20, 2005 || Palomar || NEAT || — || align=right | 1.2 km || 
|-id=044 bgcolor=#FA8072
| 187044 ||  || — || June 8, 2005 || Socorro || LINEAR || — || align=right data-sort-value="0.82" | 820 m || 
|-id=045 bgcolor=#fefefe
| 187045 ||  || — || June 6, 2005 || Kitt Peak || Spacewatch || — || align=right | 1.3 km || 
|-id=046 bgcolor=#fefefe
| 187046 ||  || — || June 11, 2005 || Kitt Peak || Spacewatch || — || align=right | 1.3 km || 
|-id=047 bgcolor=#fefefe
| 187047 ||  || — || June 11, 2005 || Kitt Peak || Spacewatch || — || align=right | 1.6 km || 
|-id=048 bgcolor=#fefefe
| 187048 ||  || — || June 11, 2005 || Kitt Peak || Spacewatch || FLO || align=right data-sort-value="0.87" | 870 m || 
|-id=049 bgcolor=#E9E9E9
| 187049 ||  || — || June 12, 2005 || Kitt Peak || Spacewatch || — || align=right | 1.6 km || 
|-id=050 bgcolor=#fefefe
| 187050 ||  || — || June 15, 2005 || Mount Lemmon || Mount Lemmon Survey || — || align=right data-sort-value="0.99" | 990 m || 
|-id=051 bgcolor=#fefefe
| 187051 ||  || — || June 15, 2005 || Mount Lemmon || Mount Lemmon Survey || FLO || align=right data-sort-value="0.94" | 940 m || 
|-id=052 bgcolor=#fefefe
| 187052 || 2005 MY || — || June 17, 2005 || Mount Lemmon || Mount Lemmon Survey || NYS || align=right | 2.4 km || 
|-id=053 bgcolor=#fefefe
| 187053 ||  || — || June 18, 2005 || Mount Lemmon || Mount Lemmon Survey || — || align=right | 1.3 km || 
|-id=054 bgcolor=#fefefe
| 187054 ||  || — || June 26, 2005 || Palomar || NEAT || — || align=right | 1.2 km || 
|-id=055 bgcolor=#fefefe
| 187055 ||  || — || June 28, 2005 || Kitt Peak || Spacewatch || NYS || align=right data-sort-value="0.98" | 980 m || 
|-id=056 bgcolor=#fefefe
| 187056 ||  || — || June 27, 2005 || Kitt Peak || Spacewatch || V || align=right data-sort-value="0.69" | 690 m || 
|-id=057 bgcolor=#fefefe
| 187057 ||  || — || June 27, 2005 || Kitt Peak || Spacewatch || — || align=right | 1.2 km || 
|-id=058 bgcolor=#E9E9E9
| 187058 ||  || — || June 27, 2005 || Kitt Peak || Spacewatch || — || align=right | 2.2 km || 
|-id=059 bgcolor=#fefefe
| 187059 ||  || — || June 28, 2005 || Palomar || NEAT || FLO || align=right data-sort-value="0.94" | 940 m || 
|-id=060 bgcolor=#fefefe
| 187060 ||  || — || June 29, 2005 || Kitt Peak || Spacewatch || — || align=right | 1.2 km || 
|-id=061 bgcolor=#fefefe
| 187061 ||  || — || June 29, 2005 || Kitt Peak || Spacewatch || — || align=right | 1.3 km || 
|-id=062 bgcolor=#fefefe
| 187062 ||  || — || June 28, 2005 || Palomar || NEAT || — || align=right | 1.2 km || 
|-id=063 bgcolor=#fefefe
| 187063 ||  || — || June 28, 2005 || Kitt Peak || Spacewatch || FLO || align=right | 2.4 km || 
|-id=064 bgcolor=#fefefe
| 187064 ||  || — || June 30, 2005 || Kitt Peak || Spacewatch || MAS || align=right data-sort-value="0.96" | 960 m || 
|-id=065 bgcolor=#FA8072
| 187065 ||  || — || June 30, 2005 || Kitt Peak || Spacewatch || — || align=right | 1.2 km || 
|-id=066 bgcolor=#fefefe
| 187066 ||  || — || June 30, 2005 || Kitt Peak || Spacewatch || NYS || align=right data-sort-value="0.86" | 860 m || 
|-id=067 bgcolor=#E9E9E9
| 187067 ||  || — || June 30, 2005 || Kitt Peak || Spacewatch || — || align=right | 1.5 km || 
|-id=068 bgcolor=#fefefe
| 187068 ||  || — || June 29, 2005 || Kitt Peak || Spacewatch || FLO || align=right data-sort-value="0.82" | 820 m || 
|-id=069 bgcolor=#fefefe
| 187069 ||  || — || June 30, 2005 || Anderson Mesa || LONEOS || FLO || align=right data-sort-value="0.88" | 880 m || 
|-id=070 bgcolor=#fefefe
| 187070 ||  || — || June 30, 2005 || Anderson Mesa || LONEOS || V || align=right data-sort-value="0.95" | 950 m || 
|-id=071 bgcolor=#fefefe
| 187071 ||  || — || June 28, 2005 || Palomar || NEAT || — || align=right | 2.2 km || 
|-id=072 bgcolor=#fefefe
| 187072 ||  || — || July 1, 2005 || Kitt Peak || Spacewatch || — || align=right data-sort-value="0.87" | 870 m || 
|-id=073 bgcolor=#d6d6d6
| 187073 ||  || — || July 4, 2005 || Kitt Peak || Spacewatch || — || align=right | 4.7 km || 
|-id=074 bgcolor=#fefefe
| 187074 ||  || — || July 5, 2005 || Palomar || NEAT || — || align=right | 1.0 km || 
|-id=075 bgcolor=#fefefe
| 187075 ||  || — || July 4, 2005 || Mount Lemmon || Mount Lemmon Survey || NYS || align=right | 1.1 km || 
|-id=076 bgcolor=#fefefe
| 187076 ||  || — || July 5, 2005 || Kitt Peak || Spacewatch || — || align=right | 1.3 km || 
|-id=077 bgcolor=#fefefe
| 187077 ||  || — || July 8, 2005 || Kitt Peak || Spacewatch || FLO || align=right data-sort-value="0.81" | 810 m || 
|-id=078 bgcolor=#fefefe
| 187078 ||  || — || July 10, 2005 || Kitt Peak || Spacewatch || NYS || align=right | 1.1 km || 
|-id=079 bgcolor=#fefefe
| 187079 ||  || — || July 10, 2005 || Kitt Peak || Spacewatch || — || align=right data-sort-value="0.94" | 940 m || 
|-id=080 bgcolor=#fefefe
| 187080 ||  || — || July 9, 2005 || Catalina || CSS || — || align=right | 1.2 km || 
|-id=081 bgcolor=#E9E9E9
| 187081 ||  || — || July 1, 2005 || Kitt Peak || Spacewatch || — || align=right | 1.3 km || 
|-id=082 bgcolor=#fefefe
| 187082 ||  || — || July 3, 2005 || Palomar || NEAT || FLO || align=right | 1.1 km || 
|-id=083 bgcolor=#fefefe
| 187083 ||  || — || July 14, 2005 || Reedy Creek || J. Broughton || — || align=right | 1.3 km || 
|-id=084 bgcolor=#fefefe
| 187084 ||  || — || July 3, 2005 || Mount Lemmon || Mount Lemmon Survey || MAS || align=right | 1.4 km || 
|-id=085 bgcolor=#E9E9E9
| 187085 ||  || — || July 12, 2005 || Kitt Peak || Spacewatch || WIT || align=right | 1.3 km || 
|-id=086 bgcolor=#fefefe
| 187086 ||  || — || July 26, 2005 || Palomar || NEAT || V || align=right | 1.00 km || 
|-id=087 bgcolor=#fefefe
| 187087 ||  || — || July 30, 2005 || Palomar || NEAT || V || align=right | 1.1 km || 
|-id=088 bgcolor=#fefefe
| 187088 ||  || — || July 30, 2005 || Siding Spring || SSS || — || align=right | 1.3 km || 
|-id=089 bgcolor=#fefefe
| 187089 ||  || — || August 7, 2005 || Reedy Creek || J. Broughton || FLO || align=right data-sort-value="0.89" | 890 m || 
|-id=090 bgcolor=#E9E9E9
| 187090 ||  || — || August 4, 2005 || Palomar || NEAT || — || align=right | 1.1 km || 
|-id=091 bgcolor=#fefefe
| 187091 ||  || — || August 6, 2005 || Palomar || NEAT || NYS || align=right data-sort-value="0.98" | 980 m || 
|-id=092 bgcolor=#fefefe
| 187092 ||  || — || August 24, 2005 || Palomar || NEAT || — || align=right | 1.3 km || 
|-id=093 bgcolor=#fefefe
| 187093 ||  || — || August 24, 2005 || Palomar || NEAT || SUL || align=right | 3.2 km || 
|-id=094 bgcolor=#fefefe
| 187094 ||  || — || August 24, 2005 || Palomar || NEAT || — || align=right | 2.3 km || 
|-id=095 bgcolor=#fefefe
| 187095 ||  || — || August 22, 2005 || Palomar || NEAT || — || align=right | 1.6 km || 
|-id=096 bgcolor=#fefefe
| 187096 ||  || — || August 24, 2005 || Palomar || NEAT || NYS || align=right data-sort-value="0.86" | 860 m || 
|-id=097 bgcolor=#E9E9E9
| 187097 ||  || — || August 25, 2005 || Palomar || NEAT || — || align=right | 1.3 km || 
|-id=098 bgcolor=#E9E9E9
| 187098 ||  || — || August 26, 2005 || Anderson Mesa || LONEOS || — || align=right | 3.2 km || 
|-id=099 bgcolor=#fefefe
| 187099 ||  || — || August 26, 2005 || Anderson Mesa || LONEOS || — || align=right data-sort-value="0.98" | 980 m || 
|-id=100 bgcolor=#fefefe
| 187100 ||  || — || August 27, 2005 || Kitt Peak || Spacewatch || MAS || align=right | 1.2 km || 
|}

187101–187200 

|-bgcolor=#E9E9E9
| 187101 ||  || — || August 27, 2005 || Kitt Peak || Spacewatch || — || align=right | 2.4 km || 
|-id=102 bgcolor=#fefefe
| 187102 ||  || — || August 29, 2005 || Anderson Mesa || LONEOS || NYS || align=right | 1.0 km || 
|-id=103 bgcolor=#fefefe
| 187103 ||  || — || August 25, 2005 || Palomar || NEAT || NYS || align=right | 1.0 km || 
|-id=104 bgcolor=#E9E9E9
| 187104 ||  || — || August 25, 2005 || Palomar || NEAT || MAR || align=right | 1.4 km || 
|-id=105 bgcolor=#fefefe
| 187105 ||  || — || August 25, 2005 || Palomar || NEAT || — || align=right | 1.6 km || 
|-id=106 bgcolor=#E9E9E9
| 187106 ||  || — || August 26, 2005 || Anderson Mesa || LONEOS || HNS || align=right | 1.9 km || 
|-id=107 bgcolor=#fefefe
| 187107 ||  || — || August 26, 2005 || Palomar || NEAT || MAS || align=right | 1.2 km || 
|-id=108 bgcolor=#fefefe
| 187108 ||  || — || August 26, 2005 || Palomar || NEAT || NYS || align=right | 1.0 km || 
|-id=109 bgcolor=#fefefe
| 187109 ||  || — || August 26, 2005 || Palomar || NEAT || — || align=right | 1.4 km || 
|-id=110 bgcolor=#fefefe
| 187110 ||  || — || August 28, 2005 || Anderson Mesa || LONEOS || MAS || align=right | 1.2 km || 
|-id=111 bgcolor=#fefefe
| 187111 ||  || — || August 28, 2005 || Kitt Peak || Spacewatch || NYS || align=right | 3.0 km || 
|-id=112 bgcolor=#fefefe
| 187112 ||  || — || August 26, 2005 || Anderson Mesa || LONEOS || — || align=right | 1.2 km || 
|-id=113 bgcolor=#E9E9E9
| 187113 ||  || — || August 26, 2005 || Palomar || NEAT || — || align=right | 1.4 km || 
|-id=114 bgcolor=#fefefe
| 187114 ||  || — || August 28, 2005 || Siding Spring || SSS || V || align=right | 1.0 km || 
|-id=115 bgcolor=#fefefe
| 187115 ||  || — || August 29, 2005 || Kitt Peak || Spacewatch || NYS || align=right | 2.8 km || 
|-id=116 bgcolor=#fefefe
| 187116 ||  || — || August 29, 2005 || Kitt Peak || Spacewatch || NYS || align=right data-sort-value="0.94" | 940 m || 
|-id=117 bgcolor=#d6d6d6
| 187117 ||  || — || August 29, 2005 || Anderson Mesa || LONEOS || — || align=right | 3.2 km || 
|-id=118 bgcolor=#E9E9E9
| 187118 ||  || — || August 25, 2005 || Palomar || NEAT || HOF || align=right | 3.4 km || 
|-id=119 bgcolor=#fefefe
| 187119 ||  || — || August 26, 2005 || Campo Imperatore || CINEOS || — || align=right | 1.1 km || 
|-id=120 bgcolor=#fefefe
| 187120 ||  || — || August 29, 2005 || Anderson Mesa || LONEOS || — || align=right | 1.2 km || 
|-id=121 bgcolor=#d6d6d6
| 187121 ||  || — || August 29, 2005 || Socorro || LINEAR || — || align=right | 4.9 km || 
|-id=122 bgcolor=#fefefe
| 187122 ||  || — || August 29, 2005 || Anderson Mesa || LONEOS || — || align=right data-sort-value="0.94" | 940 m || 
|-id=123 bgcolor=#E9E9E9
| 187123 Schorderet ||  ||  || August 30, 2005 || Vicques || M. Ory || — || align=right | 1.9 km || 
|-id=124 bgcolor=#fefefe
| 187124 ||  || — || August 30, 2005 || Socorro || LINEAR || — || align=right | 1.3 km || 
|-id=125 bgcolor=#E9E9E9
| 187125 Marxgyörgy ||  ||  || August 31, 2005 || Piszkéstető || K. Sárneczky, Z. Kuli || — || align=right | 2.8 km || 
|-id=126 bgcolor=#fefefe
| 187126 ||  || — || August 25, 2005 || Campo Imperatore || CINEOS || NYS || align=right | 1.1 km || 
|-id=127 bgcolor=#fefefe
| 187127 ||  || — || August 27, 2005 || Palomar || NEAT || — || align=right | 1.4 km || 
|-id=128 bgcolor=#E9E9E9
| 187128 ||  || — || August 27, 2005 || Palomar || NEAT || — || align=right | 2.0 km || 
|-id=129 bgcolor=#E9E9E9
| 187129 ||  || — || August 27, 2005 || Palomar || NEAT || — || align=right | 2.9 km || 
|-id=130 bgcolor=#d6d6d6
| 187130 ||  || — || August 27, 2005 || Palomar || NEAT || — || align=right | 3.4 km || 
|-id=131 bgcolor=#E9E9E9
| 187131 ||  || — || August 27, 2005 || Palomar || NEAT || — || align=right | 1.6 km || 
|-id=132 bgcolor=#E9E9E9
| 187132 ||  || — || August 27, 2005 || Palomar || NEAT || HOF || align=right | 3.8 km || 
|-id=133 bgcolor=#E9E9E9
| 187133 ||  || — || August 27, 2005 || Palomar || NEAT || — || align=right | 3.8 km || 
|-id=134 bgcolor=#fefefe
| 187134 ||  || — || August 28, 2005 || Kitt Peak || Spacewatch || — || align=right data-sort-value="0.90" | 900 m || 
|-id=135 bgcolor=#E9E9E9
| 187135 ||  || — || August 28, 2005 || Kitt Peak || Spacewatch || — || align=right | 2.3 km || 
|-id=136 bgcolor=#E9E9E9
| 187136 ||  || — || August 28, 2005 || Kitt Peak || Spacewatch || AGN || align=right | 1.4 km || 
|-id=137 bgcolor=#E9E9E9
| 187137 ||  || — || August 28, 2005 || Kitt Peak || Spacewatch || — || align=right | 2.0 km || 
|-id=138 bgcolor=#d6d6d6
| 187138 ||  || — || August 28, 2005 || Kitt Peak || Spacewatch || KOR || align=right | 1.9 km || 
|-id=139 bgcolor=#fefefe
| 187139 ||  || — || August 29, 2005 || Socorro || LINEAR || — || align=right | 2.4 km || 
|-id=140 bgcolor=#fefefe
| 187140 ||  || — || August 27, 2005 || Palomar || NEAT || V || align=right | 1.1 km || 
|-id=141 bgcolor=#fefefe
| 187141 ||  || — || August 28, 2005 || Anderson Mesa || LONEOS || — || align=right | 1.4 km || 
|-id=142 bgcolor=#fefefe
| 187142 ||  || — || August 30, 2005 || Anderson Mesa || LONEOS || V || align=right data-sort-value="0.97" | 970 m || 
|-id=143 bgcolor=#E9E9E9
| 187143 ||  || — || August 28, 2005 || Siding Spring || SSS || — || align=right | 1.2 km || 
|-id=144 bgcolor=#fefefe
| 187144 ||  || — || August 30, 2005 || Palomar || NEAT || — || align=right | 1.4 km || 
|-id=145 bgcolor=#E9E9E9
| 187145 ||  || — || August 31, 2005 || Palomar || NEAT || AGN || align=right | 1.9 km || 
|-id=146 bgcolor=#E9E9E9
| 187146 ||  || — || August 31, 2005 || Palomar || NEAT || — || align=right | 2.0 km || 
|-id=147 bgcolor=#fefefe
| 187147 ||  || — || August 29, 2005 || Palomar || NEAT || V || align=right | 1.2 km || 
|-id=148 bgcolor=#E9E9E9
| 187148 ||  || — || August 29, 2005 || Palomar || NEAT || WIT || align=right | 3.8 km || 
|-id=149 bgcolor=#fefefe
| 187149 ||  || — || August 31, 2005 || Kitt Peak || Spacewatch || — || align=right | 1.3 km || 
|-id=150 bgcolor=#E9E9E9
| 187150 ||  || — || August 31, 2005 || Palomar || NEAT || PAD || align=right | 2.2 km || 
|-id=151 bgcolor=#E9E9E9
| 187151 ||  || — || August 27, 2005 || Palomar || NEAT || WIT || align=right | 1.6 km || 
|-id=152 bgcolor=#E9E9E9
| 187152 ||  || — || August 29, 2005 || Kitt Peak || Spacewatch || — || align=right | 1.7 km || 
|-id=153 bgcolor=#E9E9E9
| 187153 ||  || — || August 31, 2005 || Kitt Peak || Spacewatch || — || align=right | 1.9 km || 
|-id=154 bgcolor=#E9E9E9
| 187154 ||  || — || August 25, 2005 || Palomar || NEAT || — || align=right | 1.9 km || 
|-id=155 bgcolor=#fefefe
| 187155 ||  || — || September 5, 2005 || Catalina || CSS || NYS || align=right | 1.1 km || 
|-id=156 bgcolor=#fefefe
| 187156 ||  || — || September 6, 2005 || Anderson Mesa || LONEOS || V || align=right data-sort-value="0.81" | 810 m || 
|-id=157 bgcolor=#E9E9E9
| 187157 ||  || — || September 9, 2005 || Socorro || LINEAR || ADE || align=right | 2.1 km || 
|-id=158 bgcolor=#E9E9E9
| 187158 ||  || — || September 8, 2005 || Uccle || T. Pauwels || — || align=right | 3.1 km || 
|-id=159 bgcolor=#fefefe
| 187159 ||  || — || September 8, 2005 || Socorro || LINEAR || — || align=right | 1.2 km || 
|-id=160 bgcolor=#fefefe
| 187160 ||  || — || September 8, 2005 || Socorro || LINEAR || EUT || align=right data-sort-value="0.95" | 950 m || 
|-id=161 bgcolor=#fefefe
| 187161 ||  || — || September 11, 2005 || Jarnac || Jarnac Obs. || V || align=right | 1.1 km || 
|-id=162 bgcolor=#fefefe
| 187162 ||  || — || September 12, 2005 || Haleakala || NEAT || — || align=right | 1.3 km || 
|-id=163 bgcolor=#fefefe
| 187163 ||  || — || September 13, 2005 || Anderson Mesa || LONEOS || PHO || align=right | 1.6 km || 
|-id=164 bgcolor=#E9E9E9
| 187164 ||  || — || September 14, 2005 || Kitt Peak || Spacewatch || — || align=right | 1.9 km || 
|-id=165 bgcolor=#E9E9E9
| 187165 ||  || — || September 14, 2005 || Kitt Peak || Spacewatch || — || align=right | 1.0 km || 
|-id=166 bgcolor=#E9E9E9
| 187166 ||  || — || September 14, 2005 || Apache Point || A. C. Becker || — || align=right | 3.3 km || 
|-id=167 bgcolor=#E9E9E9
| 187167 ||  || — || September 23, 2005 || Catalina || CSS || BRU || align=right | 3.4 km || 
|-id=168 bgcolor=#d6d6d6
| 187168 ||  || — || September 25, 2005 || Kitt Peak || Spacewatch || — || align=right | 4.0 km || 
|-id=169 bgcolor=#d6d6d6
| 187169 ||  || — || September 24, 2005 || Kitt Peak || Spacewatch || KAR || align=right | 1.3 km || 
|-id=170 bgcolor=#fefefe
| 187170 ||  || — || September 24, 2005 || Kitt Peak || Spacewatch || MAS || align=right | 1.1 km || 
|-id=171 bgcolor=#E9E9E9
| 187171 ||  || — || September 24, 2005 || Kitt Peak || Spacewatch || — || align=right | 3.4 km || 
|-id=172 bgcolor=#d6d6d6
| 187172 ||  || — || September 26, 2005 || Kitt Peak || Spacewatch || KOR || align=right | 1.9 km || 
|-id=173 bgcolor=#E9E9E9
| 187173 ||  || — || September 23, 2005 || Kitt Peak || Spacewatch || AEO || align=right | 1.8 km || 
|-id=174 bgcolor=#E9E9E9
| 187174 ||  || — || September 23, 2005 || Kitt Peak || Spacewatch || — || align=right | 1.9 km || 
|-id=175 bgcolor=#E9E9E9
| 187175 ||  || — || September 23, 2005 || Kitt Peak || Spacewatch || — || align=right | 2.0 km || 
|-id=176 bgcolor=#fefefe
| 187176 ||  || — || September 24, 2005 || Kitt Peak || Spacewatch || MAS || align=right data-sort-value="0.95" | 950 m || 
|-id=177 bgcolor=#d6d6d6
| 187177 ||  || — || September 24, 2005 || Kitt Peak || Spacewatch || THM || align=right | 2.9 km || 
|-id=178 bgcolor=#E9E9E9
| 187178 ||  || — || September 24, 2005 || Kitt Peak || Spacewatch || HEN || align=right | 1.4 km || 
|-id=179 bgcolor=#d6d6d6
| 187179 ||  || — || September 24, 2005 || Kitt Peak || Spacewatch || — || align=right | 3.4 km || 
|-id=180 bgcolor=#d6d6d6
| 187180 ||  || — || September 24, 2005 || Kitt Peak || Spacewatch || EOS || align=right | 3.0 km || 
|-id=181 bgcolor=#d6d6d6
| 187181 ||  || — || September 24, 2005 || Kitt Peak || Spacewatch || HYG || align=right | 3.5 km || 
|-id=182 bgcolor=#E9E9E9
| 187182 ||  || — || September 24, 2005 || Kitt Peak || Spacewatch || — || align=right | 1.2 km || 
|-id=183 bgcolor=#d6d6d6
| 187183 ||  || — || September 26, 2005 || Kitt Peak || Spacewatch || — || align=right | 3.5 km || 
|-id=184 bgcolor=#E9E9E9
| 187184 ||  || — || September 26, 2005 || Palomar || NEAT || — || align=right | 2.3 km || 
|-id=185 bgcolor=#E9E9E9
| 187185 ||  || — || September 26, 2005 || Kitt Peak || Spacewatch || HEN || align=right | 1.4 km || 
|-id=186 bgcolor=#E9E9E9
| 187186 ||  || — || September 26, 2005 || Kitt Peak || Spacewatch || — || align=right | 2.5 km || 
|-id=187 bgcolor=#E9E9E9
| 187187 ||  || — || September 26, 2005 || Catalina || CSS || — || align=right | 3.5 km || 
|-id=188 bgcolor=#d6d6d6
| 187188 ||  || — || September 27, 2005 || Kitt Peak || Spacewatch || — || align=right | 4.5 km || 
|-id=189 bgcolor=#E9E9E9
| 187189 ||  || — || September 27, 2005 || Kitt Peak || Spacewatch || — || align=right | 2.6 km || 
|-id=190 bgcolor=#E9E9E9
| 187190 ||  || — || September 27, 2005 || Kitt Peak || Spacewatch || PAD || align=right | 2.7 km || 
|-id=191 bgcolor=#fefefe
| 187191 ||  || — || September 27, 2005 || Kitt Peak || Spacewatch || NYS || align=right | 1.1 km || 
|-id=192 bgcolor=#E9E9E9
| 187192 ||  || — || September 27, 2005 || Palomar || NEAT || PAD || align=right | 2.7 km || 
|-id=193 bgcolor=#d6d6d6
| 187193 ||  || — || September 23, 2005 || Catalina || CSS || — || align=right | 4.3 km || 
|-id=194 bgcolor=#d6d6d6
| 187194 ||  || — || September 24, 2005 || Kitt Peak || Spacewatch || — || align=right | 2.9 km || 
|-id=195 bgcolor=#E9E9E9
| 187195 ||  || — || September 24, 2005 || Kitt Peak || Spacewatch || — || align=right | 2.6 km || 
|-id=196 bgcolor=#E9E9E9
| 187196 ||  || — || September 24, 2005 || Kitt Peak || Spacewatch || HEN || align=right | 1.1 km || 
|-id=197 bgcolor=#E9E9E9
| 187197 ||  || — || September 24, 2005 || Kitt Peak || Spacewatch || AGN || align=right | 1.6 km || 
|-id=198 bgcolor=#E9E9E9
| 187198 ||  || — || September 24, 2005 || Kitt Peak || Spacewatch || — || align=right | 2.7 km || 
|-id=199 bgcolor=#E9E9E9
| 187199 ||  || — || September 24, 2005 || Kitt Peak || Spacewatch || HEN || align=right | 1.2 km || 
|-id=200 bgcolor=#E9E9E9
| 187200 ||  || — || September 24, 2005 || Kitt Peak || Spacewatch || — || align=right | 2.2 km || 
|}

187201–187300 

|-bgcolor=#E9E9E9
| 187201 ||  || — || September 24, 2005 || Kitt Peak || Spacewatch || — || align=right | 2.0 km || 
|-id=202 bgcolor=#d6d6d6
| 187202 ||  || — || September 24, 2005 || Kitt Peak || Spacewatch || THM || align=right | 5.4 km || 
|-id=203 bgcolor=#d6d6d6
| 187203 ||  || — || September 24, 2005 || Kitt Peak || Spacewatch || fast? || align=right | 3.3 km || 
|-id=204 bgcolor=#E9E9E9
| 187204 ||  || — || September 24, 2005 || Kitt Peak || Spacewatch || — || align=right | 3.3 km || 
|-id=205 bgcolor=#E9E9E9
| 187205 ||  || — || September 24, 2005 || Kitt Peak || Spacewatch || — || align=right | 2.1 km || 
|-id=206 bgcolor=#E9E9E9
| 187206 ||  || — || September 25, 2005 || Kitt Peak || Spacewatch || — || align=right | 2.7 km || 
|-id=207 bgcolor=#E9E9E9
| 187207 ||  || — || September 25, 2005 || Kitt Peak || Spacewatch || — || align=right | 3.1 km || 
|-id=208 bgcolor=#E9E9E9
| 187208 ||  || — || September 25, 2005 || Kitt Peak || Spacewatch || — || align=right | 1.7 km || 
|-id=209 bgcolor=#E9E9E9
| 187209 ||  || — || September 25, 2005 || Kitt Peak || Spacewatch || — || align=right | 2.7 km || 
|-id=210 bgcolor=#E9E9E9
| 187210 ||  || — || September 25, 2005 || Kitt Peak || Spacewatch || — || align=right | 1.7 km || 
|-id=211 bgcolor=#d6d6d6
| 187211 ||  || — || September 25, 2005 || Palomar || NEAT || — || align=right | 5.2 km || 
|-id=212 bgcolor=#E9E9E9
| 187212 ||  || — || September 25, 2005 || Kitt Peak || Spacewatch || — || align=right | 2.4 km || 
|-id=213 bgcolor=#d6d6d6
| 187213 ||  || — || September 26, 2005 || Kitt Peak || Spacewatch || — || align=right | 2.3 km || 
|-id=214 bgcolor=#d6d6d6
| 187214 ||  || — || September 26, 2005 || Kitt Peak || Spacewatch || HYG || align=right | 3.9 km || 
|-id=215 bgcolor=#E9E9E9
| 187215 ||  || — || September 26, 2005 || Palomar || NEAT || — || align=right | 3.3 km || 
|-id=216 bgcolor=#E9E9E9
| 187216 ||  || — || September 26, 2005 || Kitt Peak || Spacewatch || — || align=right | 2.2 km || 
|-id=217 bgcolor=#E9E9E9
| 187217 ||  || — || September 28, 2005 || Palomar || NEAT || — || align=right | 4.2 km || 
|-id=218 bgcolor=#fefefe
| 187218 ||  || — || September 29, 2005 || Kitt Peak || Spacewatch || NYS || align=right data-sort-value="0.69" | 690 m || 
|-id=219 bgcolor=#E9E9E9
| 187219 ||  || — || September 29, 2005 || Mount Lemmon || Mount Lemmon Survey || NEM || align=right | 2.7 km || 
|-id=220 bgcolor=#E9E9E9
| 187220 ||  || — || September 29, 2005 || Anderson Mesa || LONEOS || AGN || align=right | 1.9 km || 
|-id=221 bgcolor=#E9E9E9
| 187221 ||  || — || September 29, 2005 || Kitt Peak || Spacewatch || — || align=right | 2.6 km || 
|-id=222 bgcolor=#d6d6d6
| 187222 ||  || — || September 24, 2005 || Kitt Peak || Spacewatch || — || align=right | 2.5 km || 
|-id=223 bgcolor=#d6d6d6
| 187223 ||  || — || September 25, 2005 || Kitt Peak || Spacewatch || KAR || align=right | 1.3 km || 
|-id=224 bgcolor=#d6d6d6
| 187224 ||  || — || September 25, 2005 || Kitt Peak || Spacewatch || — || align=right | 2.6 km || 
|-id=225 bgcolor=#d6d6d6
| 187225 ||  || — || September 25, 2005 || Kitt Peak || Spacewatch || KOR || align=right | 2.0 km || 
|-id=226 bgcolor=#E9E9E9
| 187226 ||  || — || September 25, 2005 || Kitt Peak || Spacewatch || — || align=right | 2.7 km || 
|-id=227 bgcolor=#d6d6d6
| 187227 ||  || — || September 25, 2005 || Kitt Peak || Spacewatch || KOR || align=right | 1.4 km || 
|-id=228 bgcolor=#d6d6d6
| 187228 ||  || — || September 25, 2005 || Kitt Peak || Spacewatch || — || align=right | 3.0 km || 
|-id=229 bgcolor=#d6d6d6
| 187229 ||  || — || September 25, 2005 || Kitt Peak || Spacewatch || KOR || align=right | 1.3 km || 
|-id=230 bgcolor=#E9E9E9
| 187230 ||  || — || September 25, 2005 || Palomar || NEAT || WAT || align=right | 2.7 km || 
|-id=231 bgcolor=#E9E9E9
| 187231 ||  || — || September 25, 2005 || Palomar || NEAT || — || align=right | 4.0 km || 
|-id=232 bgcolor=#fefefe
| 187232 ||  || — || September 26, 2005 || Catalina || CSS || — || align=right | 1.4 km || 
|-id=233 bgcolor=#E9E9E9
| 187233 ||  || — || September 26, 2005 || Kitt Peak || Spacewatch || — || align=right | 1.1 km || 
|-id=234 bgcolor=#E9E9E9
| 187234 ||  || — || September 26, 2005 || Kitt Peak || Spacewatch || — || align=right | 2.9 km || 
|-id=235 bgcolor=#E9E9E9
| 187235 ||  || — || September 26, 2005 || Kitt Peak || Spacewatch || WIT || align=right | 1.5 km || 
|-id=236 bgcolor=#d6d6d6
| 187236 ||  || — || September 27, 2005 || Kitt Peak || Spacewatch || — || align=right | 2.9 km || 
|-id=237 bgcolor=#E9E9E9
| 187237 ||  || — || September 27, 2005 || Kitt Peak || Spacewatch || — || align=right | 2.6 km || 
|-id=238 bgcolor=#E9E9E9
| 187238 ||  || — || September 28, 2005 || Palomar || NEAT || — || align=right | 2.3 km || 
|-id=239 bgcolor=#E9E9E9
| 187239 ||  || — || September 29, 2005 || Kitt Peak || Spacewatch || — || align=right | 1.7 km || 
|-id=240 bgcolor=#fefefe
| 187240 ||  || — || September 29, 2005 || Mount Lemmon || Mount Lemmon Survey || NYS || align=right | 1.1 km || 
|-id=241 bgcolor=#fefefe
| 187241 ||  || — || September 29, 2005 || Mount Lemmon || Mount Lemmon Survey || MAS || align=right data-sort-value="0.84" | 840 m || 
|-id=242 bgcolor=#fefefe
| 187242 ||  || — || September 29, 2005 || Mount Lemmon || Mount Lemmon Survey || NYS || align=right data-sort-value="0.86" | 860 m || 
|-id=243 bgcolor=#E9E9E9
| 187243 ||  || — || September 29, 2005 || Kitt Peak || Spacewatch || — || align=right | 2.4 km || 
|-id=244 bgcolor=#E9E9E9
| 187244 ||  || — || September 29, 2005 || Anderson Mesa || LONEOS || — || align=right | 3.6 km || 
|-id=245 bgcolor=#d6d6d6
| 187245 ||  || — || September 29, 2005 || Anderson Mesa || LONEOS || THM || align=right | 3.2 km || 
|-id=246 bgcolor=#E9E9E9
| 187246 ||  || — || September 29, 2005 || Catalina || CSS || — || align=right | 3.3 km || 
|-id=247 bgcolor=#E9E9E9
| 187247 ||  || — || September 30, 2005 || Kitt Peak || Spacewatch || — || align=right | 2.5 km || 
|-id=248 bgcolor=#d6d6d6
| 187248 ||  || — || September 30, 2005 || Palomar || NEAT || — || align=right | 4.4 km || 
|-id=249 bgcolor=#d6d6d6
| 187249 ||  || — || September 30, 2005 || Palomar || NEAT || — || align=right | 4.3 km || 
|-id=250 bgcolor=#d6d6d6
| 187250 ||  || — || September 30, 2005 || Catalina || CSS || — || align=right | 6.2 km || 
|-id=251 bgcolor=#d6d6d6
| 187251 ||  || — || September 30, 2005 || Kitt Peak || Spacewatch || — || align=right | 2.7 km || 
|-id=252 bgcolor=#d6d6d6
| 187252 ||  || — || September 30, 2005 || Mount Lemmon || Mount Lemmon Survey || KOR || align=right | 1.6 km || 
|-id=253 bgcolor=#E9E9E9
| 187253 ||  || — || September 29, 2005 || Mount Lemmon || Mount Lemmon Survey || — || align=right | 2.8 km || 
|-id=254 bgcolor=#d6d6d6
| 187254 ||  || — || September 29, 2005 || Kitt Peak || Spacewatch || — || align=right | 5.2 km || 
|-id=255 bgcolor=#d6d6d6
| 187255 ||  || — || September 30, 2005 || Kitt Peak || Spacewatch || KOR || align=right | 1.7 km || 
|-id=256 bgcolor=#E9E9E9
| 187256 ||  || — || September 30, 2005 || Palomar || NEAT || HOF || align=right | 4.0 km || 
|-id=257 bgcolor=#E9E9E9
| 187257 ||  || — || September 23, 2005 || Kitt Peak || Spacewatch || PAD || align=right | 2.8 km || 
|-id=258 bgcolor=#fefefe
| 187258 ||  || — || September 24, 2005 || Anderson Mesa || LONEOS || — || align=right | 1.3 km || 
|-id=259 bgcolor=#d6d6d6
| 187259 ||  || — || September 24, 2005 || Kitt Peak || Spacewatch || — || align=right | 3.1 km || 
|-id=260 bgcolor=#d6d6d6
| 187260 ||  || — || September 30, 2005 || Mount Lemmon || Mount Lemmon Survey || KOR || align=right | 1.5 km || 
|-id=261 bgcolor=#d6d6d6
| 187261 ||  || — || September 23, 2005 || Kitt Peak || Spacewatch || — || align=right | 3.1 km || 
|-id=262 bgcolor=#d6d6d6
| 187262 ||  || — || September 26, 2005 || Kitt Peak || Spacewatch || KOR || align=right | 1.9 km || 
|-id=263 bgcolor=#E9E9E9
| 187263 ||  || — || October 1, 2005 || Catalina || CSS || — || align=right | 2.4 km || 
|-id=264 bgcolor=#E9E9E9
| 187264 ||  || — || October 1, 2005 || Anderson Mesa || LONEOS || GEF || align=right | 1.8 km || 
|-id=265 bgcolor=#d6d6d6
| 187265 ||  || — || October 1, 2005 || Mount Lemmon || Mount Lemmon Survey || MRC || align=right | 4.1 km || 
|-id=266 bgcolor=#E9E9E9
| 187266 ||  || — || October 1, 2005 || Kitt Peak || Spacewatch || — || align=right | 3.2 km || 
|-id=267 bgcolor=#fefefe
| 187267 ||  || — || October 1, 2005 || Kitt Peak || Spacewatch || MAS || align=right data-sort-value="0.90" | 900 m || 
|-id=268 bgcolor=#fefefe
| 187268 ||  || — || October 1, 2005 || Socorro || LINEAR || — || align=right | 1.0 km || 
|-id=269 bgcolor=#d6d6d6
| 187269 ||  || — || October 1, 2005 || Kitt Peak || Spacewatch || — || align=right | 3.2 km || 
|-id=270 bgcolor=#E9E9E9
| 187270 ||  || — || October 1, 2005 || Kitt Peak || Spacewatch || HEN || align=right | 1.3 km || 
|-id=271 bgcolor=#d6d6d6
| 187271 ||  || — || October 1, 2005 || Anderson Mesa || LONEOS || CHA || align=right | 3.5 km || 
|-id=272 bgcolor=#E9E9E9
| 187272 ||  || — || October 5, 2005 || Socorro || LINEAR || XIZ || align=right | 1.9 km || 
|-id=273 bgcolor=#E9E9E9
| 187273 ||  || — || October 5, 2005 || Socorro || LINEAR || — || align=right | 4.7 km || 
|-id=274 bgcolor=#fefefe
| 187274 ||  || — || October 7, 2005 || Reedy Creek || J. Broughton || — || align=right | 3.0 km || 
|-id=275 bgcolor=#E9E9E9
| 187275 ||  || — || October 3, 2005 || Catalina || CSS || — || align=right | 1.3 km || 
|-id=276 bgcolor=#E9E9E9
| 187276 Meistas ||  ||  || October 8, 2005 || Moletai || K. Černis, J. Zdanavičius || MRX || align=right | 1.9 km || 
|-id=277 bgcolor=#E9E9E9
| 187277 ||  || — || October 1, 2005 || Anderson Mesa || LONEOS || EUN || align=right | 1.0 km || 
|-id=278 bgcolor=#E9E9E9
| 187278 ||  || — || October 5, 2005 || Socorro || LINEAR || AGN || align=right | 1.5 km || 
|-id=279 bgcolor=#d6d6d6
| 187279 ||  || — || October 1, 2005 || Mount Lemmon || Mount Lemmon Survey || — || align=right | 4.1 km || 
|-id=280 bgcolor=#d6d6d6
| 187280 ||  || — || October 1, 2005 || Mount Lemmon || Mount Lemmon Survey || — || align=right | 3.1 km || 
|-id=281 bgcolor=#E9E9E9
| 187281 ||  || — || October 1, 2005 || Mount Lemmon || Mount Lemmon Survey || HEN || align=right | 1.7 km || 
|-id=282 bgcolor=#E9E9E9
| 187282 ||  || — || October 4, 2005 || Mount Lemmon || Mount Lemmon Survey || — || align=right | 2.8 km || 
|-id=283 bgcolor=#E9E9E9
| 187283 Jeffhopkins ||  ||  || October 3, 2005 || Catalina || CSS || AGN || align=right | 1.7 km || 
|-id=284 bgcolor=#d6d6d6
| 187284 ||  || — || October 6, 2005 || Kitt Peak || Spacewatch || — || align=right | 3.7 km || 
|-id=285 bgcolor=#E9E9E9
| 187285 ||  || — || October 5, 2005 || Catalina || CSS || — || align=right | 1.7 km || 
|-id=286 bgcolor=#E9E9E9
| 187286 ||  || — || October 5, 2005 || Catalina || CSS || — || align=right | 2.7 km || 
|-id=287 bgcolor=#d6d6d6
| 187287 ||  || — || October 7, 2005 || Anderson Mesa || LONEOS || — || align=right | 5.1 km || 
|-id=288 bgcolor=#E9E9E9
| 187288 ||  || — || October 5, 2005 || Mount Lemmon || Mount Lemmon Survey || — || align=right | 1.0 km || 
|-id=289 bgcolor=#E9E9E9
| 187289 ||  || — || October 6, 2005 || Mount Lemmon || Mount Lemmon Survey || HEN || align=right | 1.4 km || 
|-id=290 bgcolor=#E9E9E9
| 187290 ||  || — || October 7, 2005 || Socorro || LINEAR || — || align=right | 2.4 km || 
|-id=291 bgcolor=#E9E9E9
| 187291 ||  || — || October 7, 2005 || Socorro || LINEAR || — || align=right | 2.2 km || 
|-id=292 bgcolor=#fefefe
| 187292 ||  || — || October 7, 2005 || Catalina || CSS || MAS || align=right data-sort-value="0.93" | 930 m || 
|-id=293 bgcolor=#d6d6d6
| 187293 ||  || — || October 7, 2005 || Kitt Peak || Spacewatch || — || align=right | 4.3 km || 
|-id=294 bgcolor=#E9E9E9
| 187294 ||  || — || October 7, 2005 || Kitt Peak || Spacewatch || — || align=right | 2.6 km || 
|-id=295 bgcolor=#d6d6d6
| 187295 ||  || — || October 7, 2005 || Kitt Peak || Spacewatch || — || align=right | 2.9 km || 
|-id=296 bgcolor=#d6d6d6
| 187296 ||  || — || October 8, 2005 || Kitt Peak || Spacewatch || KOR || align=right | 1.6 km || 
|-id=297 bgcolor=#d6d6d6
| 187297 ||  || — || October 8, 2005 || Kitt Peak || Spacewatch || EOS || align=right | 2.6 km || 
|-id=298 bgcolor=#E9E9E9
| 187298 ||  || — || October 8, 2005 || Kitt Peak || Spacewatch || — || align=right | 2.6 km || 
|-id=299 bgcolor=#d6d6d6
| 187299 ||  || — || October 10, 2005 || Kitt Peak || Spacewatch || THM || align=right | 2.9 km || 
|-id=300 bgcolor=#d6d6d6
| 187300 ||  || — || October 9, 2005 || Kitt Peak || Spacewatch || EOS || align=right | 2.8 km || 
|}

187301–187400 

|-bgcolor=#E9E9E9
| 187301 ||  || — || October 1, 2005 || Mount Lemmon || Mount Lemmon Survey || HEN || align=right | 1.5 km || 
|-id=302 bgcolor=#d6d6d6
| 187302 ||  || — || October 1, 2005 || Catalina || CSS || — || align=right | 3.9 km || 
|-id=303 bgcolor=#d6d6d6
| 187303 ||  || — || October 1, 2005 || Mount Lemmon || Mount Lemmon Survey || 3:2 || align=right | 4.1 km || 
|-id=304 bgcolor=#E9E9E9
| 187304 || 2005 UV || — || October 23, 2005 || Wrightwood || J. W. Young || — || align=right | 2.4 km || 
|-id=305 bgcolor=#E9E9E9
| 187305 ||  || — || October 23, 2005 || Eskridge || Farpoint Obs. || — || align=right | 3.1 km || 
|-id=306 bgcolor=#E9E9E9
| 187306 ||  || — || October 25, 2005 || Goodricke-Pigott || R. A. Tucker || — || align=right | 2.7 km || 
|-id=307 bgcolor=#E9E9E9
| 187307 ||  || — || October 21, 2005 || Palomar || NEAT || EUN || align=right | 2.3 km || 
|-id=308 bgcolor=#d6d6d6
| 187308 ||  || — || October 21, 2005 || Palomar || NEAT || KOR || align=right | 1.9 km || 
|-id=309 bgcolor=#d6d6d6
| 187309 ||  || — || October 22, 2005 || Kitt Peak || Spacewatch || — || align=right | 3.1 km || 
|-id=310 bgcolor=#E9E9E9
| 187310 ||  || — || October 22, 2005 || Catalina || CSS || AGN || align=right | 1.7 km || 
|-id=311 bgcolor=#E9E9E9
| 187311 ||  || — || October 23, 2005 || Catalina || CSS || VIB || align=right | 3.0 km || 
|-id=312 bgcolor=#d6d6d6
| 187312 ||  || — || October 23, 2005 || Kitt Peak || Spacewatch || — || align=right | 3.3 km || 
|-id=313 bgcolor=#d6d6d6
| 187313 ||  || — || October 24, 2005 || Kitt Peak || Spacewatch || HYG || align=right | 3.6 km || 
|-id=314 bgcolor=#d6d6d6
| 187314 ||  || — || October 24, 2005 || Kitt Peak || Spacewatch || HYG || align=right | 3.6 km || 
|-id=315 bgcolor=#d6d6d6
| 187315 ||  || — || October 24, 2005 || Kitt Peak || Spacewatch || KOR || align=right | 2.0 km || 
|-id=316 bgcolor=#d6d6d6
| 187316 ||  || — || October 24, 2005 || Kitt Peak || Spacewatch || — || align=right | 3.1 km || 
|-id=317 bgcolor=#d6d6d6
| 187317 ||  || — || October 24, 2005 || Kitt Peak || Spacewatch || KOR || align=right | 1.8 km || 
|-id=318 bgcolor=#d6d6d6
| 187318 ||  || — || October 24, 2005 || Kitt Peak || Spacewatch || — || align=right | 4.3 km || 
|-id=319 bgcolor=#d6d6d6
| 187319 ||  || — || October 22, 2005 || Kitt Peak || Spacewatch || — || align=right | 6.0 km || 
|-id=320 bgcolor=#E9E9E9
| 187320 ||  || — || October 23, 2005 || Catalina || CSS || MRX || align=right | 1.5 km || 
|-id=321 bgcolor=#d6d6d6
| 187321 ||  || — || October 23, 2005 || Catalina || CSS || HYG || align=right | 3.5 km || 
|-id=322 bgcolor=#E9E9E9
| 187322 ||  || — || October 24, 2005 || Kitt Peak || Spacewatch || — || align=right | 1.2 km || 
|-id=323 bgcolor=#E9E9E9
| 187323 ||  || — || October 25, 2005 || Anderson Mesa || LONEOS || — || align=right | 2.2 km || 
|-id=324 bgcolor=#E9E9E9
| 187324 ||  || — || October 22, 2005 || Palomar || NEAT || MRX || align=right | 1.6 km || 
|-id=325 bgcolor=#d6d6d6
| 187325 ||  || — || October 23, 2005 || Palomar || NEAT || — || align=right | 5.6 km || 
|-id=326 bgcolor=#d6d6d6
| 187326 ||  || — || October 25, 2005 || Mount Lemmon || Mount Lemmon Survey || — || align=right | 3.1 km || 
|-id=327 bgcolor=#d6d6d6
| 187327 ||  || — || October 25, 2005 || Catalina || CSS || VER || align=right | 4.8 km || 
|-id=328 bgcolor=#E9E9E9
| 187328 ||  || — || October 25, 2005 || Kitt Peak || Spacewatch || HOF || align=right | 4.2 km || 
|-id=329 bgcolor=#d6d6d6
| 187329 ||  || — || October 25, 2005 || Kitt Peak || Spacewatch || EOS || align=right | 3.2 km || 
|-id=330 bgcolor=#d6d6d6
| 187330 ||  || — || October 22, 2005 || Kitt Peak || Spacewatch || — || align=right | 2.6 km || 
|-id=331 bgcolor=#d6d6d6
| 187331 ||  || — || October 22, 2005 || Kitt Peak || Spacewatch || — || align=right | 3.7 km || 
|-id=332 bgcolor=#d6d6d6
| 187332 ||  || — || October 22, 2005 || Kitt Peak || Spacewatch || — || align=right | 3.2 km || 
|-id=333 bgcolor=#d6d6d6
| 187333 ||  || — || October 22, 2005 || Kitt Peak || Spacewatch || — || align=right | 4.4 km || 
|-id=334 bgcolor=#E9E9E9
| 187334 ||  || — || October 22, 2005 || Kitt Peak || Spacewatch || HOF || align=right | 4.3 km || 
|-id=335 bgcolor=#E9E9E9
| 187335 ||  || — || October 22, 2005 || Kitt Peak || Spacewatch || — || align=right | 1.9 km || 
|-id=336 bgcolor=#E9E9E9
| 187336 ||  || — || October 22, 2005 || Palomar || NEAT || — || align=right | 2.5 km || 
|-id=337 bgcolor=#E9E9E9
| 187337 ||  || — || October 22, 2005 || Catalina || CSS || — || align=right | 1.3 km || 
|-id=338 bgcolor=#d6d6d6
| 187338 ||  || — || October 23, 2005 || Catalina || CSS || — || align=right | 4.0 km || 
|-id=339 bgcolor=#d6d6d6
| 187339 ||  || — || October 24, 2005 || Kitt Peak || Spacewatch || KOR || align=right | 2.2 km || 
|-id=340 bgcolor=#d6d6d6
| 187340 ||  || — || October 24, 2005 || Palomar || NEAT || — || align=right | 4.2 km || 
|-id=341 bgcolor=#E9E9E9
| 187341 ||  || — || October 25, 2005 || Catalina || CSS || — || align=right | 2.4 km || 
|-id=342 bgcolor=#d6d6d6
| 187342 ||  || — || October 25, 2005 || Catalina || CSS || — || align=right | 2.7 km || 
|-id=343 bgcolor=#E9E9E9
| 187343 ||  || — || October 28, 2005 || Goodricke-Pigott || R. A. Tucker || — || align=right | 3.5 km || 
|-id=344 bgcolor=#E9E9E9
| 187344 ||  || — || October 22, 2005 || Catalina || CSS || — || align=right | 2.4 km || 
|-id=345 bgcolor=#E9E9E9
| 187345 ||  || — || October 22, 2005 || Catalina || CSS || AST || align=right | 2.5 km || 
|-id=346 bgcolor=#d6d6d6
| 187346 ||  || — || October 24, 2005 || Kitt Peak || Spacewatch || KAR || align=right | 1.4 km || 
|-id=347 bgcolor=#d6d6d6
| 187347 ||  || — || October 27, 2005 || Mount Lemmon || Mount Lemmon Survey || — || align=right | 3.1 km || 
|-id=348 bgcolor=#d6d6d6
| 187348 ||  || — || October 22, 2005 || Kitt Peak || Spacewatch || — || align=right | 5.0 km || 
|-id=349 bgcolor=#E9E9E9
| 187349 ||  || — || October 25, 2005 || Kitt Peak || Spacewatch || — || align=right | 2.4 km || 
|-id=350 bgcolor=#d6d6d6
| 187350 ||  || — || October 25, 2005 || Kitt Peak || Spacewatch || EOS || align=right | 2.3 km || 
|-id=351 bgcolor=#E9E9E9
| 187351 ||  || — || October 21, 2005 || Palomar || NEAT || — || align=right | 2.0 km || 
|-id=352 bgcolor=#d6d6d6
| 187352 ||  || — || October 24, 2005 || Palomar || NEAT || — || align=right | 4.7 km || 
|-id=353 bgcolor=#d6d6d6
| 187353 ||  || — || October 25, 2005 || Kitt Peak || Spacewatch || — || align=right | 5.5 km || 
|-id=354 bgcolor=#d6d6d6
| 187354 ||  || — || October 25, 2005 || Kitt Peak || Spacewatch || KOR || align=right | 1.6 km || 
|-id=355 bgcolor=#d6d6d6
| 187355 ||  || — || October 25, 2005 || Kitt Peak || Spacewatch || — || align=right | 3.7 km || 
|-id=356 bgcolor=#d6d6d6
| 187356 ||  || — || October 25, 2005 || Kitt Peak || Spacewatch || EOS || align=right | 5.9 km || 
|-id=357 bgcolor=#d6d6d6
| 187357 ||  || — || October 25, 2005 || Kitt Peak || Spacewatch || — || align=right | 4.0 km || 
|-id=358 bgcolor=#d6d6d6
| 187358 ||  || — || October 23, 2005 || Catalina || CSS || — || align=right | 5.4 km || 
|-id=359 bgcolor=#d6d6d6
| 187359 ||  || — || October 25, 2005 || Kitt Peak || Spacewatch || EOS || align=right | 4.0 km || 
|-id=360 bgcolor=#d6d6d6
| 187360 ||  || — || October 25, 2005 || Kitt Peak || Spacewatch || — || align=right | 3.4 km || 
|-id=361 bgcolor=#d6d6d6
| 187361 ||  || — || October 25, 2005 || Kitt Peak || Spacewatch || HYG || align=right | 3.7 km || 
|-id=362 bgcolor=#E9E9E9
| 187362 ||  || — || October 26, 2005 || Kitt Peak || Spacewatch || — || align=right | 3.0 km || 
|-id=363 bgcolor=#E9E9E9
| 187363 ||  || — || October 26, 2005 || Kitt Peak || Spacewatch || — || align=right | 1.8 km || 
|-id=364 bgcolor=#d6d6d6
| 187364 ||  || — || October 27, 2005 || Kitt Peak || Spacewatch || EOS || align=right | 3.2 km || 
|-id=365 bgcolor=#d6d6d6
| 187365 ||  || — || October 28, 2005 || Kitt Peak || Spacewatch || KOR || align=right | 2.1 km || 
|-id=366 bgcolor=#d6d6d6
| 187366 ||  || — || October 28, 2005 || Mount Lemmon || Mount Lemmon Survey || — || align=right | 2.7 km || 
|-id=367 bgcolor=#d6d6d6
| 187367 ||  || — || October 24, 2005 || Kitt Peak || Spacewatch || — || align=right | 5.0 km || 
|-id=368 bgcolor=#E9E9E9
| 187368 ||  || — || October 24, 2005 || Kitt Peak || Spacewatch || — || align=right | 2.4 km || 
|-id=369 bgcolor=#E9E9E9
| 187369 ||  || — || October 25, 2005 || Catalina || CSS || — || align=right | 1.6 km || 
|-id=370 bgcolor=#d6d6d6
| 187370 ||  || — || October 28, 2005 || Catalina || CSS || — || align=right | 4.6 km || 
|-id=371 bgcolor=#d6d6d6
| 187371 ||  || — || October 27, 2005 || Kitt Peak || Spacewatch || — || align=right | 3.8 km || 
|-id=372 bgcolor=#d6d6d6
| 187372 ||  || — || October 27, 2005 || Kitt Peak || Spacewatch || — || align=right | 5.2 km || 
|-id=373 bgcolor=#d6d6d6
| 187373 ||  || — || October 28, 2005 || Kitt Peak || Spacewatch || — || align=right | 4.6 km || 
|-id=374 bgcolor=#d6d6d6
| 187374 ||  || — || October 30, 2005 || Palomar || NEAT || CRO || align=right | 5.9 km || 
|-id=375 bgcolor=#d6d6d6
| 187375 ||  || — || October 29, 2005 || Catalina || CSS || CHA || align=right | 2.9 km || 
|-id=376 bgcolor=#d6d6d6
| 187376 ||  || — || October 25, 2005 || Mount Lemmon || Mount Lemmon Survey || — || align=right | 3.5 km || 
|-id=377 bgcolor=#d6d6d6
| 187377 ||  || — || October 27, 2005 || Kitt Peak || Spacewatch || KOR || align=right | 1.5 km || 
|-id=378 bgcolor=#d6d6d6
| 187378 ||  || — || October 27, 2005 || Kitt Peak || Spacewatch || HIL3:2 || align=right | 6.1 km || 
|-id=379 bgcolor=#d6d6d6
| 187379 ||  || — || October 27, 2005 || Kitt Peak || Spacewatch || — || align=right | 3.7 km || 
|-id=380 bgcolor=#E9E9E9
| 187380 ||  || — || October 30, 2005 || Catalina || CSS || MAR || align=right | 1.7 km || 
|-id=381 bgcolor=#d6d6d6
| 187381 ||  || — || October 30, 2005 || Mount Lemmon || Mount Lemmon Survey || KOR || align=right | 1.6 km || 
|-id=382 bgcolor=#d6d6d6
| 187382 ||  || — || October 27, 2005 || Kitt Peak || Spacewatch || — || align=right | 4.2 km || 
|-id=383 bgcolor=#d6d6d6
| 187383 ||  || — || October 29, 2005 || Mount Lemmon || Mount Lemmon Survey || THM || align=right | 3.1 km || 
|-id=384 bgcolor=#d6d6d6
| 187384 ||  || — || October 30, 2005 || Mount Lemmon || Mount Lemmon Survey || — || align=right | 2.4 km || 
|-id=385 bgcolor=#d6d6d6
| 187385 ||  || — || October 31, 2005 || Mount Lemmon || Mount Lemmon Survey || EOS || align=right | 2.9 km || 
|-id=386 bgcolor=#E9E9E9
| 187386 ||  || — || October 28, 2005 || Kitt Peak || Spacewatch || AGN || align=right | 1.7 km || 
|-id=387 bgcolor=#d6d6d6
| 187387 ||  || — || October 30, 2005 || Kitt Peak || Spacewatch || — || align=right | 4.2 km || 
|-id=388 bgcolor=#d6d6d6
| 187388 ||  || — || October 28, 2005 || Mount Lemmon || Mount Lemmon Survey || — || align=right | 3.7 km || 
|-id=389 bgcolor=#d6d6d6
| 187389 ||  || — || October 30, 2005 || Kitt Peak || Spacewatch || — || align=right | 4.1 km || 
|-id=390 bgcolor=#E9E9E9
| 187390 ||  || — || October 22, 2005 || Catalina || CSS || — || align=right | 3.1 km || 
|-id=391 bgcolor=#E9E9E9
| 187391 ||  || — || October 22, 2005 || Catalina || CSS || PAD || align=right | 2.1 km || 
|-id=392 bgcolor=#d6d6d6
| 187392 ||  || — || October 24, 2005 || Palomar || NEAT || URS || align=right | 6.7 km || 
|-id=393 bgcolor=#E9E9E9
| 187393 ||  || — || October 25, 2005 || Catalina || CSS || MIT || align=right | 5.7 km || 
|-id=394 bgcolor=#E9E9E9
| 187394 ||  || — || October 27, 2005 || Catalina || CSS || — || align=right | 4.1 km || 
|-id=395 bgcolor=#d6d6d6
| 187395 ||  || — || October 27, 2005 || Anderson Mesa || LONEOS || — || align=right | 4.8 km || 
|-id=396 bgcolor=#E9E9E9
| 187396 ||  || — || October 25, 2005 || Apache Point || A. C. Becker || — || align=right | 2.4 km || 
|-id=397 bgcolor=#E9E9E9
| 187397 ||  || — || October 27, 2005 || Apache Point || A. C. Becker || — || align=right | 1.3 km || 
|-id=398 bgcolor=#E9E9E9
| 187398 ||  || — || November 2, 2005 || Mount Lemmon || Mount Lemmon Survey || — || align=right | 2.8 km || 
|-id=399 bgcolor=#E9E9E9
| 187399 ||  || — || November 4, 2005 || Kitt Peak || Spacewatch || — || align=right | 3.1 km || 
|-id=400 bgcolor=#d6d6d6
| 187400 ||  || — || November 2, 2005 || Mount Lemmon || Mount Lemmon Survey || HYG || align=right | 5.3 km || 
|}

187401–187500 

|-bgcolor=#d6d6d6
| 187401 ||  || — || November 2, 2005 || Mount Lemmon || Mount Lemmon Survey || — || align=right | 3.7 km || 
|-id=402 bgcolor=#d6d6d6
| 187402 ||  || — || November 3, 2005 || Mount Lemmon || Mount Lemmon Survey || EOS || align=right | 3.0 km || 
|-id=403 bgcolor=#d6d6d6
| 187403 ||  || — || November 3, 2005 || Mount Lemmon || Mount Lemmon Survey || HYG || align=right | 3.7 km || 
|-id=404 bgcolor=#E9E9E9
| 187404 ||  || — || November 5, 2005 || Mount Lemmon || Mount Lemmon Survey || — || align=right | 3.2 km || 
|-id=405 bgcolor=#E9E9E9
| 187405 ||  || — || November 4, 2005 || Mount Lemmon || Mount Lemmon Survey || — || align=right | 4.6 km || 
|-id=406 bgcolor=#d6d6d6
| 187406 ||  || — || November 1, 2005 || Socorro || LINEAR || — || align=right | 5.6 km || 
|-id=407 bgcolor=#d6d6d6
| 187407 ||  || — || November 3, 2005 || Mount Lemmon || Mount Lemmon Survey || EOS || align=right | 3.2 km || 
|-id=408 bgcolor=#E9E9E9
| 187408 ||  || — || November 4, 2005 || Mount Lemmon || Mount Lemmon Survey || — || align=right | 2.0 km || 
|-id=409 bgcolor=#d6d6d6
| 187409 ||  || — || November 4, 2005 || Mount Lemmon || Mount Lemmon Survey || — || align=right | 4.6 km || 
|-id=410 bgcolor=#d6d6d6
| 187410 ||  || — || November 5, 2005 || Mount Lemmon || Mount Lemmon Survey || EOS || align=right | 3.2 km || 
|-id=411 bgcolor=#d6d6d6
| 187411 ||  || — || November 1, 2005 || Mount Lemmon || Mount Lemmon Survey || KOR || align=right | 2.2 km || 
|-id=412 bgcolor=#E9E9E9
| 187412 ||  || — || November 1, 2005 || Mount Lemmon || Mount Lemmon Survey || — || align=right | 1.9 km || 
|-id=413 bgcolor=#d6d6d6
| 187413 ||  || — || November 1, 2005 || Mount Lemmon || Mount Lemmon Survey || — || align=right | 3.6 km || 
|-id=414 bgcolor=#E9E9E9
| 187414 ||  || — || November 6, 2005 || Socorro || LINEAR || — || align=right | 2.9 km || 
|-id=415 bgcolor=#E9E9E9
| 187415 ||  || — || November 6, 2005 || Socorro || LINEAR || — || align=right | 1.3 km || 
|-id=416 bgcolor=#d6d6d6
| 187416 ||  || — || November 6, 2005 || Mount Lemmon || Mount Lemmon Survey || — || align=right | 3.2 km || 
|-id=417 bgcolor=#d6d6d6
| 187417 ||  || — || November 3, 2005 || Mount Lemmon || Mount Lemmon Survey || — || align=right | 2.9 km || 
|-id=418 bgcolor=#d6d6d6
| 187418 ||  || — || November 5, 2005 || Kitt Peak || Spacewatch || — || align=right | 3.1 km || 
|-id=419 bgcolor=#d6d6d6
| 187419 ||  || — || November 6, 2005 || Kitt Peak || Spacewatch || KOR || align=right | 1.9 km || 
|-id=420 bgcolor=#d6d6d6
| 187420 ||  || — || November 3, 2005 || Kitt Peak || Spacewatch || KOR || align=right | 2.1 km || 
|-id=421 bgcolor=#d6d6d6
| 187421 ||  || — || November 6, 2005 || Mount Lemmon || Mount Lemmon Survey || EOS || align=right | 3.1 km || 
|-id=422 bgcolor=#d6d6d6
| 187422 ||  || — || November 6, 2005 || Mount Lemmon || Mount Lemmon Survey || 628 || align=right | 3.1 km || 
|-id=423 bgcolor=#d6d6d6
| 187423 ||  || — || November 10, 2005 || Campo Imperatore || CINEOS || SHU3:2 || align=right | 6.2 km || 
|-id=424 bgcolor=#fefefe
| 187424 ||  || — || November 15, 2005 || Palomar || NEAT || SVE || align=right | 3.9 km || 
|-id=425 bgcolor=#d6d6d6
| 187425 ||  || — || November 2, 2005 || Catalina || CSS || FIR || align=right | 5.5 km || 
|-id=426 bgcolor=#E9E9E9
| 187426 ||  || — || November 20, 2005 || Palomar || NEAT || — || align=right | 4.4 km || 
|-id=427 bgcolor=#d6d6d6
| 187427 ||  || — || November 21, 2005 || Catalina || CSS || — || align=right | 5.8 km || 
|-id=428 bgcolor=#E9E9E9
| 187428 ||  || — || November 21, 2005 || Catalina || CSS || — || align=right | 2.5 km || 
|-id=429 bgcolor=#d6d6d6
| 187429 ||  || — || November 22, 2005 || Kitt Peak || Spacewatch || THM || align=right | 3.4 km || 
|-id=430 bgcolor=#E9E9E9
| 187430 ||  || — || November 21, 2005 || Kitt Peak || Spacewatch || — || align=right | 1.9 km || 
|-id=431 bgcolor=#d6d6d6
| 187431 ||  || — || November 21, 2005 || Kitt Peak || Spacewatch || — || align=right | 3.5 km || 
|-id=432 bgcolor=#d6d6d6
| 187432 ||  || — || November 21, 2005 || Kitt Peak || Spacewatch || — || align=right | 4.4 km || 
|-id=433 bgcolor=#d6d6d6
| 187433 ||  || — || November 21, 2005 || Kitt Peak || Spacewatch || VER || align=right | 4.0 km || 
|-id=434 bgcolor=#d6d6d6
| 187434 ||  || — || November 22, 2005 || Kitt Peak || Spacewatch || — || align=right | 4.7 km || 
|-id=435 bgcolor=#d6d6d6
| 187435 ||  || — || November 25, 2005 || Mount Lemmon || Mount Lemmon Survey || — || align=right | 3.4 km || 
|-id=436 bgcolor=#C2FFFF
| 187436 ||  || — || November 30, 2005 || Kitt Peak || Spacewatch || L5 || align=right | 17 km || 
|-id=437 bgcolor=#E9E9E9
| 187437 ||  || — || November 25, 2005 || Catalina || CSS || — || align=right | 3.5 km || 
|-id=438 bgcolor=#d6d6d6
| 187438 ||  || — || November 26, 2005 || Mount Lemmon || Mount Lemmon Survey || — || align=right | 5.3 km || 
|-id=439 bgcolor=#E9E9E9
| 187439 ||  || — || November 26, 2005 || Catalina || CSS || — || align=right | 2.1 km || 
|-id=440 bgcolor=#d6d6d6
| 187440 ||  || — || November 26, 2005 || Mount Lemmon || Mount Lemmon Survey || — || align=right | 4.5 km || 
|-id=441 bgcolor=#d6d6d6
| 187441 ||  || — || November 26, 2005 || Mount Lemmon || Mount Lemmon Survey || — || align=right | 3.1 km || 
|-id=442 bgcolor=#d6d6d6
| 187442 ||  || — || November 26, 2005 || Kitt Peak || Spacewatch || — || align=right | 3.6 km || 
|-id=443 bgcolor=#d6d6d6
| 187443 ||  || — || November 26, 2005 || Mount Lemmon || Mount Lemmon Survey || — || align=right | 3.9 km || 
|-id=444 bgcolor=#d6d6d6
| 187444 ||  || — || November 25, 2005 || Catalina || CSS || — || align=right | 3.5 km || 
|-id=445 bgcolor=#E9E9E9
| 187445 ||  || — || November 28, 2005 || Kitt Peak || Spacewatch || — || align=right | 2.4 km || 
|-id=446 bgcolor=#d6d6d6
| 187446 ||  || — || November 30, 2005 || Anderson Mesa || LONEOS || 7:4 || align=right | 6.5 km || 
|-id=447 bgcolor=#E9E9E9
| 187447 Johnmester ||  ||  || November 29, 2005 || Goodricke-Pigott || V. Reddy || — || align=right | 4.1 km || 
|-id=448 bgcolor=#d6d6d6
| 187448 ||  || — || November 29, 2005 || Kitt Peak || Spacewatch || — || align=right | 4.7 km || 
|-id=449 bgcolor=#d6d6d6
| 187449 ||  || — || November 25, 2005 || Mount Lemmon || Mount Lemmon Survey || THM || align=right | 2.8 km || 
|-id=450 bgcolor=#d6d6d6
| 187450 ||  || — || November 29, 2005 || Palomar || NEAT || EOS || align=right | 3.2 km || 
|-id=451 bgcolor=#d6d6d6
| 187451 ||  || — || November 29, 2005 || Mount Lemmon || Mount Lemmon Survey || THM || align=right | 4.3 km || 
|-id=452 bgcolor=#E9E9E9
| 187452 ||  || — || November 21, 2005 || Anderson Mesa || LONEOS || NEM || align=right | 3.4 km || 
|-id=453 bgcolor=#E9E9E9
| 187453 ||  || — || November 22, 2005 || Catalina || CSS || EUN || align=right | 2.5 km || 
|-id=454 bgcolor=#d6d6d6
| 187454 ||  || — || November 25, 2005 || Catalina || CSS || 7:4 || align=right | 7.9 km || 
|-id=455 bgcolor=#E9E9E9
| 187455 ||  || — || November 26, 2005 || Catalina || CSS || EUN || align=right | 2.0 km || 
|-id=456 bgcolor=#C2FFFF
| 187456 ||  || — || December 4, 2005 || Kitt Peak || Spacewatch || L5 || align=right | 14 km || 
|-id=457 bgcolor=#d6d6d6
| 187457 ||  || — || December 1, 2005 || Kitt Peak || Spacewatch || — || align=right | 4.0 km || 
|-id=458 bgcolor=#E9E9E9
| 187458 ||  || — || December 2, 2005 || Socorro || LINEAR || — || align=right | 2.3 km || 
|-id=459 bgcolor=#d6d6d6
| 187459 ||  || — || December 1, 2005 || Catalina || CSS || EOS || align=right | 3.1 km || 
|-id=460 bgcolor=#d6d6d6
| 187460 ||  || — || December 4, 2005 || Kitt Peak || Spacewatch || THM || align=right | 2.9 km || 
|-id=461 bgcolor=#d6d6d6
| 187461 ||  || — || December 7, 2005 || Gnosca || S. Sposetti || HYG || align=right | 4.8 km || 
|-id=462 bgcolor=#d6d6d6
| 187462 ||  || — || December 6, 2005 || Kitt Peak || Spacewatch || — || align=right | 5.8 km || 
|-id=463 bgcolor=#C2FFFF
| 187463 ||  || — || December 1, 2005 || Kitt Peak || M. W. Buie || L5 || align=right | 14 km || 
|-id=464 bgcolor=#d6d6d6
| 187464 ||  || — || December 21, 2005 || Kitt Peak || Spacewatch || — || align=right | 2.9 km || 
|-id=465 bgcolor=#d6d6d6
| 187465 ||  || — || December 28, 2005 || Kitt Peak || Spacewatch || ALA || align=right | 4.8 km || 
|-id=466 bgcolor=#E9E9E9
| 187466 ||  || — || December 22, 2005 || Catalina || CSS || — || align=right | 2.2 km || 
|-id=467 bgcolor=#d6d6d6
| 187467 ||  || — || December 28, 2005 || Kitt Peak || Spacewatch || THM || align=right | 3.4 km || 
|-id=468 bgcolor=#d6d6d6
| 187468 ||  || — || January 5, 2006 || Socorro || LINEAR || EOS || align=right | 2.9 km || 
|-id=469 bgcolor=#C2FFFF
| 187469 ||  || — || January 25, 2006 || Kitt Peak || Spacewatch || L5 || align=right | 14 km || 
|-id=470 bgcolor=#C2FFFF
| 187470 ||  || — || January 23, 2006 || Mount Lemmon || Mount Lemmon Survey || L5 || align=right | 11 km || 
|-id=471 bgcolor=#C2FFFF
| 187471 ||  || — || January 23, 2006 || Kitt Peak || Spacewatch || L5 || align=right | 11 km || 
|-id=472 bgcolor=#C2FFFF
| 187472 ||  || — || January 23, 2006 || Kitt Peak || Spacewatch || L5 || align=right | 9.9 km || 
|-id=473 bgcolor=#C2FFFF
| 187473 ||  || — || January 23, 2006 || Mount Lemmon || Mount Lemmon Survey || L5 || align=right | 8.3 km || 
|-id=474 bgcolor=#C2FFFF
| 187474 ||  || — || January 26, 2006 || Kitt Peak || Spacewatch || L5 || align=right | 13 km || 
|-id=475 bgcolor=#C2FFFF
| 187475 ||  || — || January 26, 2006 || Kitt Peak || Spacewatch || L5 || align=right | 18 km || 
|-id=476 bgcolor=#C2FFFF
| 187476 ||  || — || January 30, 2006 || Bergisch Gladbach || W. Bickel || L5 || align=right | 16 km || 
|-id=477 bgcolor=#d6d6d6
| 187477 ||  || — || January 31, 2006 || Kitt Peak || Spacewatch || 3:2 || align=right | 6.8 km || 
|-id=478 bgcolor=#C2FFFF
| 187478 ||  || — || February 2, 2006 || Kitt Peak || Spacewatch || L5 || align=right | 12 km || 
|-id=479 bgcolor=#C2FFFF
| 187479 ||  || — || February 20, 2006 || Kitt Peak || Spacewatch || L5 || align=right | 14 km || 
|-id=480 bgcolor=#fefefe
| 187480 ||  || — || August 24, 2006 || San Marcello || Pistoia Mountains Obs. || V || align=right | 1.1 km || 
|-id=481 bgcolor=#fefefe
| 187481 ||  || — || August 27, 2006 || Anderson Mesa || LONEOS || — || align=right | 1.0 km || 
|-id=482 bgcolor=#fefefe
| 187482 ||  || — || September 15, 2006 || Kitt Peak || Spacewatch || — || align=right data-sort-value="0.79" | 790 m || 
|-id=483 bgcolor=#fefefe
| 187483 ||  || — || September 12, 2006 || Catalina || CSS || ERI || align=right | 1.8 km || 
|-id=484 bgcolor=#fefefe
| 187484 ||  || — || September 15, 2006 || Kitt Peak || Spacewatch || ERI || align=right | 2.0 km || 
|-id=485 bgcolor=#E9E9E9
| 187485 ||  || — || September 17, 2006 || Kitt Peak || Spacewatch || — || align=right | 3.6 km || 
|-id=486 bgcolor=#fefefe
| 187486 ||  || — || September 16, 2006 || Catalina || CSS || H || align=right data-sort-value="0.78" | 780 m || 
|-id=487 bgcolor=#fefefe
| 187487 ||  || — || September 17, 2006 || Kitt Peak || Spacewatch || NYS || align=right data-sort-value="0.96" | 960 m || 
|-id=488 bgcolor=#fefefe
| 187488 ||  || — || September 25, 2006 || Mount Lemmon || Mount Lemmon Survey || FLO || align=right data-sort-value="0.77" | 770 m || 
|-id=489 bgcolor=#fefefe
| 187489 ||  || — || September 25, 2006 || Mount Lemmon || Mount Lemmon Survey || V || align=right data-sort-value="0.82" | 820 m || 
|-id=490 bgcolor=#fefefe
| 187490 ||  || — || September 26, 2006 || Kitt Peak || Spacewatch || H || align=right data-sort-value="0.81" | 810 m || 
|-id=491 bgcolor=#fefefe
| 187491 ||  || — || September 25, 2006 || Mount Lemmon || Mount Lemmon Survey || — || align=right data-sort-value="0.90" | 900 m || 
|-id=492 bgcolor=#E9E9E9
| 187492 ||  || — || September 26, 2006 || Mount Lemmon || Mount Lemmon Survey || EUN || align=right | 1.2 km || 
|-id=493 bgcolor=#E9E9E9
| 187493 ||  || — || September 28, 2006 || Bergisch Gladbach || W. Bickel || — || align=right | 3.9 km || 
|-id=494 bgcolor=#fefefe
| 187494 ||  || — || September 25, 2006 || Kitt Peak || Spacewatch || FLO || align=right | 1.0 km || 
|-id=495 bgcolor=#fefefe
| 187495 ||  || — || September 25, 2006 || Kitt Peak || Spacewatch || — || align=right data-sort-value="0.82" | 820 m || 
|-id=496 bgcolor=#E9E9E9
| 187496 ||  || — || September 27, 2006 || Kitt Peak || Spacewatch || — || align=right | 1.9 km || 
|-id=497 bgcolor=#fefefe
| 187497 ||  || — || September 27, 2006 || Kitt Peak || Spacewatch || NYS || align=right data-sort-value="0.81" | 810 m || 
|-id=498 bgcolor=#fefefe
| 187498 ||  || — || September 27, 2006 || Kitt Peak || Spacewatch || NYS || align=right data-sort-value="0.92" | 920 m || 
|-id=499 bgcolor=#E9E9E9
| 187499 ||  || — || September 28, 2006 || Kitt Peak || Spacewatch || — || align=right data-sort-value="0.97" | 970 m || 
|-id=500 bgcolor=#fefefe
| 187500 ||  || — || September 30, 2006 || Catalina || CSS || — || align=right data-sort-value="0.93" | 930 m || 
|}

187501–187600 

|-bgcolor=#fefefe
| 187501 ||  || — || September 30, 2006 || Catalina || CSS || V || align=right data-sort-value="0.99" | 990 m || 
|-id=502 bgcolor=#E9E9E9
| 187502 ||  || — || September 30, 2006 || Catalina || CSS || — || align=right | 3.4 km || 
|-id=503 bgcolor=#E9E9E9
| 187503 ||  || — || September 28, 2006 || Mount Lemmon || Mount Lemmon Survey || — || align=right | 3.8 km || 
|-id=504 bgcolor=#E9E9E9
| 187504 ||  || — || September 30, 2006 || Mount Lemmon || Mount Lemmon Survey || — || align=right | 1.2 km || 
|-id=505 bgcolor=#fefefe
| 187505 ||  || — || September 27, 2006 || Mount Lemmon || Mount Lemmon Survey || FLO || align=right data-sort-value="0.98" | 980 m || 
|-id=506 bgcolor=#E9E9E9
| 187506 ||  || — || October 11, 2006 || Kitt Peak || Spacewatch || VIB || align=right | 2.5 km || 
|-id=507 bgcolor=#fefefe
| 187507 ||  || — || October 12, 2006 || Kitt Peak || Spacewatch || — || align=right | 1.2 km || 
|-id=508 bgcolor=#E9E9E9
| 187508 ||  || — || October 12, 2006 || Kitt Peak || Spacewatch || — || align=right | 2.1 km || 
|-id=509 bgcolor=#fefefe
| 187509 ||  || — || October 12, 2006 || Kitt Peak || Spacewatch || FLO || align=right data-sort-value="0.88" | 880 m || 
|-id=510 bgcolor=#fefefe
| 187510 ||  || — || October 12, 2006 || Kitt Peak || Spacewatch || MAS || align=right | 1.1 km || 
|-id=511 bgcolor=#E9E9E9
| 187511 ||  || — || October 10, 2006 || Palomar || NEAT || — || align=right | 2.9 km || 
|-id=512 bgcolor=#fefefe
| 187512 ||  || — || October 11, 2006 || Palomar || NEAT || — || align=right data-sort-value="0.89" | 890 m || 
|-id=513 bgcolor=#fefefe
| 187513 ||  || — || October 13, 2006 || Kitt Peak || Spacewatch || MAS || align=right | 1.1 km || 
|-id=514 bgcolor=#E9E9E9
| 187514 Tainan ||  ||  || October 15, 2006 || Lulin Observatory || C.-S. Lin, Q.-z. Ye || — || align=right | 2.5 km || 
|-id=515 bgcolor=#fefefe
| 187515 ||  || — || October 13, 2006 || Kitt Peak || Spacewatch || — || align=right | 1.1 km || 
|-id=516 bgcolor=#fefefe
| 187516 ||  || — || October 15, 2006 || Kitt Peak || Spacewatch || V || align=right data-sort-value="0.78" | 780 m || 
|-id=517 bgcolor=#d6d6d6
| 187517 ||  || — || October 2, 2006 || Mount Lemmon || Mount Lemmon Survey || — || align=right | 2.3 km || 
|-id=518 bgcolor=#fefefe
| 187518 ||  || — || October 13, 2006 || Kitt Peak || Spacewatch || SUL || align=right | 2.7 km || 
|-id=519 bgcolor=#E9E9E9
| 187519 ||  || — || October 16, 2006 || Catalina || CSS || — || align=right | 1.3 km || 
|-id=520 bgcolor=#fefefe
| 187520 ||  || — || October 16, 2006 || Catalina || CSS || NYS || align=right data-sort-value="0.93" | 930 m || 
|-id=521 bgcolor=#fefefe
| 187521 ||  || — || October 17, 2006 || Mount Lemmon || Mount Lemmon Survey || — || align=right | 1.0 km || 
|-id=522 bgcolor=#fefefe
| 187522 ||  || — || October 17, 2006 || Mount Lemmon || Mount Lemmon Survey || FLO || align=right data-sort-value="0.89" | 890 m || 
|-id=523 bgcolor=#fefefe
| 187523 ||  || — || October 17, 2006 || Mount Lemmon || Mount Lemmon Survey || — || align=right | 1.2 km || 
|-id=524 bgcolor=#fefefe
| 187524 ||  || — || October 16, 2006 || Kitt Peak || Spacewatch || — || align=right data-sort-value="0.92" | 920 m || 
|-id=525 bgcolor=#fefefe
| 187525 ||  || — || October 16, 2006 || Kitt Peak || Spacewatch || — || align=right data-sort-value="0.73" | 730 m || 
|-id=526 bgcolor=#E9E9E9
| 187526 ||  || — || October 16, 2006 || Kitt Peak || Spacewatch || — || align=right | 1.0 km || 
|-id=527 bgcolor=#fefefe
| 187527 ||  || — || October 16, 2006 || Kitt Peak || Spacewatch || NYS || align=right data-sort-value="0.91" | 910 m || 
|-id=528 bgcolor=#fefefe
| 187528 ||  || — || October 19, 2006 || Mount Lemmon || Mount Lemmon Survey || — || align=right | 1.0 km || 
|-id=529 bgcolor=#E9E9E9
| 187529 ||  || — || October 19, 2006 || Catalina || CSS || EUN || align=right | 1.8 km || 
|-id=530 bgcolor=#E9E9E9
| 187530 ||  || — || October 17, 2006 || Mount Lemmon || Mount Lemmon Survey || — || align=right | 2.0 km || 
|-id=531 bgcolor=#fefefe
| 187531 Omorichugakkou ||  ||  || October 20, 2006 || Mount Nyukasa Stn. || Y. Sorimachi, A. Nakajima || — || align=right data-sort-value="0.98" | 980 m || 
|-id=532 bgcolor=#E9E9E9
| 187532 ||  || — || October 23, 2006 || Kitami || K. Endate || EUN || align=right | 2.4 km || 
|-id=533 bgcolor=#fefefe
| 187533 ||  || — || October 17, 2006 || Mount Lemmon || Mount Lemmon Survey || V || align=right data-sort-value="0.85" | 850 m || 
|-id=534 bgcolor=#fefefe
| 187534 ||  || — || October 17, 2006 || Mount Lemmon || Mount Lemmon Survey || FLO || align=right | 1.0 km || 
|-id=535 bgcolor=#E9E9E9
| 187535 ||  || — || October 17, 2006 || Mount Lemmon || Mount Lemmon Survey || — || align=right | 2.9 km || 
|-id=536 bgcolor=#E9E9E9
| 187536 ||  || — || October 17, 2006 || Kitt Peak || Spacewatch || — || align=right | 2.5 km || 
|-id=537 bgcolor=#fefefe
| 187537 ||  || — || October 18, 2006 || Kitt Peak || Spacewatch || FLO || align=right data-sort-value="0.94" | 940 m || 
|-id=538 bgcolor=#fefefe
| 187538 ||  || — || October 18, 2006 || Kitt Peak || Spacewatch || — || align=right data-sort-value="0.83" | 830 m || 
|-id=539 bgcolor=#fefefe
| 187539 ||  || — || October 18, 2006 || Kitt Peak || Spacewatch || NYS || align=right data-sort-value="0.81" | 810 m || 
|-id=540 bgcolor=#fefefe
| 187540 ||  || — || October 19, 2006 || Kitt Peak || Spacewatch || — || align=right | 1.2 km || 
|-id=541 bgcolor=#d6d6d6
| 187541 ||  || — || October 20, 2006 || Catalina || CSS || EUP || align=right | 5.7 km || 
|-id=542 bgcolor=#fefefe
| 187542 ||  || — || October 17, 2006 || Catalina || CSS || — || align=right data-sort-value="0.98" | 980 m || 
|-id=543 bgcolor=#d6d6d6
| 187543 ||  || — || October 19, 2006 || Catalina || CSS || — || align=right | 5.1 km || 
|-id=544 bgcolor=#fefefe
| 187544 ||  || — || October 21, 2006 || Kitt Peak || Spacewatch || — || align=right data-sort-value="0.97" | 970 m || 
|-id=545 bgcolor=#fefefe
| 187545 ||  || — || October 30, 2006 || Kitami || K. Endate || V || align=right data-sort-value="0.92" | 920 m || 
|-id=546 bgcolor=#E9E9E9
| 187546 ||  || — || October 17, 2006 || Mount Lemmon || Mount Lemmon Survey || — || align=right | 1.2 km || 
|-id=547 bgcolor=#d6d6d6
| 187547 ||  || — || October 21, 2006 || Palomar || NEAT || — || align=right | 3.7 km || 
|-id=548 bgcolor=#fefefe
| 187548 ||  || — || October 23, 2006 || Kitt Peak || Spacewatch || NYS || align=right data-sort-value="0.87" | 870 m || 
|-id=549 bgcolor=#E9E9E9
| 187549 ||  || — || October 23, 2006 || Mount Lemmon || Mount Lemmon Survey || — || align=right | 2.9 km || 
|-id=550 bgcolor=#fefefe
| 187550 ||  || — || October 27, 2006 || Mount Lemmon || Mount Lemmon Survey || — || align=right | 1.1 km || 
|-id=551 bgcolor=#E9E9E9
| 187551 ||  || — || October 27, 2006 || Mount Lemmon || Mount Lemmon Survey || — || align=right | 2.9 km || 
|-id=552 bgcolor=#fefefe
| 187552 ||  || — || October 27, 2006 || Kitt Peak || Spacewatch || V || align=right data-sort-value="0.82" | 820 m || 
|-id=553 bgcolor=#fefefe
| 187553 ||  || — || November 11, 2006 || Mount Lemmon || Mount Lemmon Survey || — || align=right | 1.1 km || 
|-id=554 bgcolor=#fefefe
| 187554 ||  || — || November 11, 2006 || Goodricke-Pigott || R. A. Tucker || V || align=right data-sort-value="0.80" | 800 m || 
|-id=555 bgcolor=#fefefe
| 187555 ||  || — || November 9, 2006 || Kitt Peak || Spacewatch || NYS || align=right data-sort-value="0.76" | 760 m || 
|-id=556 bgcolor=#fefefe
| 187556 ||  || — || November 10, 2006 || Kitt Peak || Spacewatch || — || align=right | 1.1 km || 
|-id=557 bgcolor=#fefefe
| 187557 ||  || — || November 10, 2006 || Kitt Peak || Spacewatch || V || align=right data-sort-value="0.92" | 920 m || 
|-id=558 bgcolor=#fefefe
| 187558 ||  || — || November 10, 2006 || Kitt Peak || Spacewatch || — || align=right data-sort-value="0.98" | 980 m || 
|-id=559 bgcolor=#fefefe
| 187559 ||  || — || November 10, 2006 || Altschwendt || W. Ries || — || align=right | 1.0 km || 
|-id=560 bgcolor=#fefefe
| 187560 ||  || — || November 11, 2006 || Mount Lemmon || Mount Lemmon Survey || — || align=right data-sort-value="0.81" | 810 m || 
|-id=561 bgcolor=#fefefe
| 187561 ||  || — || November 11, 2006 || Kitt Peak || Spacewatch || — || align=right data-sort-value="0.93" | 930 m || 
|-id=562 bgcolor=#fefefe
| 187562 ||  || — || November 11, 2006 || Kitt Peak || Spacewatch || — || align=right | 1.0 km || 
|-id=563 bgcolor=#d6d6d6
| 187563 ||  || — || November 11, 2006 || Kitt Peak || Spacewatch || — || align=right | 3.3 km || 
|-id=564 bgcolor=#fefefe
| 187564 ||  || — || November 12, 2006 || Mount Lemmon || Mount Lemmon Survey || — || align=right data-sort-value="0.90" | 900 m || 
|-id=565 bgcolor=#fefefe
| 187565 ||  || — || November 12, 2006 || Mount Lemmon || Mount Lemmon Survey || — || align=right | 1.1 km || 
|-id=566 bgcolor=#fefefe
| 187566 ||  || — || November 14, 2006 || Kitt Peak || Spacewatch || — || align=right | 1.5 km || 
|-id=567 bgcolor=#E9E9E9
| 187567 ||  || — || November 15, 2006 || Catalina || CSS || — || align=right | 2.4 km || 
|-id=568 bgcolor=#fefefe
| 187568 ||  || — || November 11, 2006 || Catalina || CSS || V || align=right | 1.1 km || 
|-id=569 bgcolor=#E9E9E9
| 187569 ||  || — || November 13, 2006 || Kitt Peak || Spacewatch || — || align=right | 1.8 km || 
|-id=570 bgcolor=#E9E9E9
| 187570 ||  || — || November 14, 2006 || Kitt Peak || Spacewatch || — || align=right | 1.1 km || 
|-id=571 bgcolor=#E9E9E9
| 187571 ||  || — || November 14, 2006 || Kitt Peak || Spacewatch || — || align=right | 2.2 km || 
|-id=572 bgcolor=#E9E9E9
| 187572 ||  || — || November 14, 2006 || Socorro || LINEAR || GER || align=right | 4.1 km || 
|-id=573 bgcolor=#E9E9E9
| 187573 ||  || — || November 15, 2006 || Catalina || CSS || — || align=right | 2.4 km || 
|-id=574 bgcolor=#fefefe
| 187574 ||  || — || November 8, 2006 || Palomar || NEAT || H || align=right data-sort-value="0.57" | 570 m || 
|-id=575 bgcolor=#fefefe
| 187575 ||  || — || November 8, 2006 || Palomar || NEAT || — || align=right | 1.0 km || 
|-id=576 bgcolor=#fefefe
| 187576 ||  || — || November 16, 2006 || Kitt Peak || Spacewatch || — || align=right | 1.1 km || 
|-id=577 bgcolor=#E9E9E9
| 187577 ||  || — || November 17, 2006 || Mount Lemmon || Mount Lemmon Survey || — || align=right | 3.2 km || 
|-id=578 bgcolor=#E9E9E9
| 187578 ||  || — || November 18, 2006 || Socorro || LINEAR || — || align=right | 1.3 km || 
|-id=579 bgcolor=#E9E9E9
| 187579 ||  || — || November 18, 2006 || Socorro || LINEAR || — || align=right | 1.9 km || 
|-id=580 bgcolor=#E9E9E9
| 187580 ||  || — || November 16, 2006 || Kitt Peak || Spacewatch || — || align=right | 2.1 km || 
|-id=581 bgcolor=#fefefe
| 187581 ||  || — || November 16, 2006 || Kitt Peak || Spacewatch || NYS || align=right data-sort-value="0.78" | 780 m || 
|-id=582 bgcolor=#E9E9E9
| 187582 ||  || — || November 16, 2006 || Kitt Peak || Spacewatch || HEN || align=right | 1.5 km || 
|-id=583 bgcolor=#fefefe
| 187583 ||  || — || November 16, 2006 || Kitt Peak || Spacewatch || FLO || align=right | 1.0 km || 
|-id=584 bgcolor=#fefefe
| 187584 ||  || — || November 17, 2006 || Mount Lemmon || Mount Lemmon Survey || — || align=right data-sort-value="0.96" | 960 m || 
|-id=585 bgcolor=#E9E9E9
| 187585 ||  || — || November 18, 2006 || Kitt Peak || Spacewatch || — || align=right | 2.2 km || 
|-id=586 bgcolor=#E9E9E9
| 187586 ||  || — || November 18, 2006 || Mount Lemmon || Mount Lemmon Survey || — || align=right | 1.9 km || 
|-id=587 bgcolor=#fefefe
| 187587 ||  || — || November 18, 2006 || Socorro || LINEAR || — || align=right | 1.2 km || 
|-id=588 bgcolor=#E9E9E9
| 187588 ||  || — || November 18, 2006 || Kitt Peak || Spacewatch || MRX || align=right | 1.6 km || 
|-id=589 bgcolor=#E9E9E9
| 187589 ||  || — || November 19, 2006 || Kitt Peak || Spacewatch || MRX || align=right | 1.5 km || 
|-id=590 bgcolor=#fefefe
| 187590 ||  || — || November 19, 2006 || Kitt Peak || Spacewatch || — || align=right data-sort-value="0.95" | 950 m || 
|-id=591 bgcolor=#E9E9E9
| 187591 ||  || — || November 19, 2006 || Kitt Peak || Spacewatch || — || align=right | 1.3 km || 
|-id=592 bgcolor=#E9E9E9
| 187592 ||  || — || November 20, 2006 || Kitt Peak || Spacewatch || MIS || align=right | 4.2 km || 
|-id=593 bgcolor=#d6d6d6
| 187593 ||  || — || November 20, 2006 || Mount Lemmon || Mount Lemmon Survey || KAR || align=right | 1.5 km || 
|-id=594 bgcolor=#E9E9E9
| 187594 ||  || — || November 24, 2006 || Nyukasa || Mount Nyukasa Stn. || — || align=right | 1.7 km || 
|-id=595 bgcolor=#d6d6d6
| 187595 ||  || — || November 24, 2006 || Nyukasa || Mount Nyukasa Stn. || — || align=right | 2.8 km || 
|-id=596 bgcolor=#fefefe
| 187596 ||  || — || November 20, 2006 || Kitt Peak || Spacewatch || V || align=right data-sort-value="0.98" | 980 m || 
|-id=597 bgcolor=#fefefe
| 187597 ||  || — || November 24, 2006 || Kitt Peak || Spacewatch || V || align=right | 1.00 km || 
|-id=598 bgcolor=#E9E9E9
| 187598 ||  || — || November 25, 2006 || Catalina || CSS || — || align=right | 1.6 km || 
|-id=599 bgcolor=#d6d6d6
| 187599 ||  || — || December 9, 2006 || Kitt Peak || Spacewatch || — || align=right | 3.2 km || 
|-id=600 bgcolor=#fefefe
| 187600 ||  || — || December 10, 2006 || Kitt Peak || Spacewatch || V || align=right | 1.1 km || 
|}

187601–187700 

|-bgcolor=#E9E9E9
| 187601 ||  || — || December 12, 2006 || Mount Lemmon || Mount Lemmon Survey || — || align=right | 1.9 km || 
|-id=602 bgcolor=#fefefe
| 187602 ||  || — || December 13, 2006 || Mount Lemmon || Mount Lemmon Survey || — || align=right | 1.0 km || 
|-id=603 bgcolor=#fefefe
| 187603 ||  || — || December 11, 2006 || Kitt Peak || Spacewatch || — || align=right | 1.4 km || 
|-id=604 bgcolor=#E9E9E9
| 187604 ||  || — || December 6, 2006 || Palomar || NEAT || — || align=right | 2.0 km || 
|-id=605 bgcolor=#fefefe
| 187605 ||  || — || December 12, 2006 || Palomar || NEAT || V || align=right data-sort-value="0.92" | 920 m || 
|-id=606 bgcolor=#E9E9E9
| 187606 ||  || — || December 12, 2006 || Mount Lemmon || Mount Lemmon Survey || — || align=right | 2.1 km || 
|-id=607 bgcolor=#C2FFFF
| 187607 ||  || — || December 21, 2006 || Kitt Peak || Spacewatch || L5 || align=right | 19 km || 
|-id=608 bgcolor=#d6d6d6
| 187608 ||  || — || December 16, 2006 || Mount Lemmon || Mount Lemmon Survey || — || align=right | 5.8 km || 
|-id=609 bgcolor=#d6d6d6
| 187609 ||  || — || December 21, 2006 || Kitt Peak || Spacewatch || — || align=right | 2.8 km || 
|-id=610 bgcolor=#fefefe
| 187610 ||  || — || December 21, 2006 || Kitt Peak || Spacewatch || — || align=right | 1.4 km || 
|-id=611 bgcolor=#E9E9E9
| 187611 ||  || — || January 8, 2007 || Mount Lemmon || Mount Lemmon Survey || — || align=right | 2.4 km || 
|-id=612 bgcolor=#d6d6d6
| 187612 ||  || — || January 8, 2007 || Kitt Peak || Spacewatch || MEL || align=right | 6.1 km || 
|-id=613 bgcolor=#E9E9E9
| 187613 ||  || — || January 9, 2007 || Mount Lemmon || Mount Lemmon Survey || HOF || align=right | 2.8 km || 
|-id=614 bgcolor=#fefefe
| 187614 ||  || — || January 10, 2007 || Mount Lemmon || Mount Lemmon Survey || MAS || align=right | 1.1 km || 
|-id=615 bgcolor=#d6d6d6
| 187615 ||  || — || January 10, 2007 || Kitt Peak || Spacewatch || — || align=right | 4.1 km || 
|-id=616 bgcolor=#d6d6d6
| 187616 ||  || — || January 15, 2007 || Catalina || CSS || LIX || align=right | 6.2 km || 
|-id=617 bgcolor=#d6d6d6
| 187617 ||  || — || January 8, 2007 || Catalina || CSS || — || align=right | 4.5 km || 
|-id=618 bgcolor=#d6d6d6
| 187618 ||  || — || January 14, 2007 || Nyukasa || Mount Nyukasa Stn. || — || align=right | 3.8 km || 
|-id=619 bgcolor=#E9E9E9
| 187619 ||  || — || January 10, 2007 || Mount Lemmon || Mount Lemmon Survey || — || align=right | 3.7 km || 
|-id=620 bgcolor=#d6d6d6
| 187620 ||  || — || January 10, 2007 || Kitt Peak || Spacewatch || — || align=right | 3.9 km || 
|-id=621 bgcolor=#d6d6d6
| 187621 ||  || — || January 14, 2007 || Socorro || LINEAR || — || align=right | 4.2 km || 
|-id=622 bgcolor=#E9E9E9
| 187622 ||  || — || January 17, 2007 || Palomar || NEAT || — || align=right | 1.5 km || 
|-id=623 bgcolor=#d6d6d6
| 187623 ||  || — || January 17, 2007 || Palomar || NEAT || — || align=right | 3.6 km || 
|-id=624 bgcolor=#E9E9E9
| 187624 ||  || — || January 17, 2007 || Palomar || NEAT || — || align=right | 1.9 km || 
|-id=625 bgcolor=#d6d6d6
| 187625 ||  || — || January 21, 2007 || Socorro || LINEAR || — || align=right | 3.8 km || 
|-id=626 bgcolor=#E9E9E9
| 187626 ||  || — || January 24, 2007 || Socorro || LINEAR || — || align=right | 1.8 km || 
|-id=627 bgcolor=#d6d6d6
| 187627 ||  || — || January 24, 2007 || Catalina || CSS || EOS || align=right | 2.4 km || 
|-id=628 bgcolor=#fefefe
| 187628 ||  || — || January 24, 2007 || Catalina || CSS || — || align=right | 1.4 km || 
|-id=629 bgcolor=#fefefe
| 187629 ||  || — || January 24, 2007 || Catalina || CSS || NYS || align=right | 1.1 km || 
|-id=630 bgcolor=#d6d6d6
| 187630 ||  || — || January 23, 2007 || Anderson Mesa || LONEOS || LIX || align=right | 5.4 km || 
|-id=631 bgcolor=#E9E9E9
| 187631 ||  || — || January 27, 2007 || Mount Lemmon || Mount Lemmon Survey || — || align=right | 2.2 km || 
|-id=632 bgcolor=#E9E9E9
| 187632 ||  || — || January 27, 2007 || Mount Lemmon || Mount Lemmon Survey || HEN || align=right | 1.9 km || 
|-id=633 bgcolor=#d6d6d6
| 187633 ||  || — || January 27, 2007 || Mount Lemmon || Mount Lemmon Survey || EOS || align=right | 3.0 km || 
|-id=634 bgcolor=#d6d6d6
| 187634 || 2007 CE || — || February 6, 2007 || Kitt Peak || Spacewatch || — || align=right | 3.4 km || 
|-id=635 bgcolor=#E9E9E9
| 187635 ||  || — || February 6, 2007 || Kitt Peak || Spacewatch || — || align=right | 2.9 km || 
|-id=636 bgcolor=#d6d6d6
| 187636 Chungyuan ||  ||  || February 6, 2007 || Lulin Observatory || H.-C. Lin, Q.-z. Ye || — || align=right | 3.8 km || 
|-id=637 bgcolor=#d6d6d6
| 187637 ||  || — || February 8, 2007 || Catalina || CSS || — || align=right | 4.0 km || 
|-id=638 bgcolor=#fefefe
| 187638 Greenewalt ||  ||  || February 11, 2007 || CBA-NOVAC || D. R. Skillman || — || align=right | 1.2 km || 
|-id=639 bgcolor=#d6d6d6
| 187639 ||  || — || February 6, 2007 || Mount Lemmon || Mount Lemmon Survey || — || align=right | 3.2 km || 
|-id=640 bgcolor=#E9E9E9
| 187640 ||  || — || February 6, 2007 || Mount Lemmon || Mount Lemmon Survey || — || align=right | 1.5 km || 
|-id=641 bgcolor=#E9E9E9
| 187641 ||  || — || February 6, 2007 || Mount Lemmon || Mount Lemmon Survey || GEF || align=right | 1.6 km || 
|-id=642 bgcolor=#d6d6d6
| 187642 ||  || — || February 7, 2007 || Kitt Peak || Spacewatch || — || align=right | 2.7 km || 
|-id=643 bgcolor=#d6d6d6
| 187643 ||  || — || February 8, 2007 || Palomar || NEAT || EOS || align=right | 5.1 km || 
|-id=644 bgcolor=#d6d6d6
| 187644 ||  || — || February 16, 2007 || Calvin-Rehoboth || Calvin–Rehoboth Obs. || HYG || align=right | 4.2 km || 
|-id=645 bgcolor=#d6d6d6
| 187645 ||  || — || February 16, 2007 || Calvin-Rehoboth || Calvin–Rehoboth Obs. || — || align=right | 3.4 km || 
|-id=646 bgcolor=#d6d6d6
| 187646 ||  || — || February 16, 2007 || Catalina || CSS || HIL3:2 || align=right | 7.6 km || 
|-id=647 bgcolor=#d6d6d6
| 187647 ||  || — || February 17, 2007 || Kitt Peak || Spacewatch || — || align=right | 4.9 km || 
|-id=648 bgcolor=#d6d6d6
| 187648 ||  || — || February 17, 2007 || Kitt Peak || Spacewatch || — || align=right | 4.1 km || 
|-id=649 bgcolor=#d6d6d6
| 187649 ||  || — || February 22, 2007 || Catalina || CSS || — || align=right | 6.5 km || 
|-id=650 bgcolor=#E9E9E9
| 187650 ||  || — || February 23, 2007 || Catalina || CSS || GER || align=right | 2.2 km || 
|-id=651 bgcolor=#E9E9E9
| 187651 ||  || — || February 23, 2007 || Mount Lemmon || Mount Lemmon Survey || — || align=right | 3.5 km || 
|-id=652 bgcolor=#d6d6d6
| 187652 ||  || — || March 10, 2007 || Mount Lemmon || Mount Lemmon Survey || — || align=right | 4.1 km || 
|-id=653 bgcolor=#d6d6d6
| 187653 ||  || — || March 10, 2007 || Kitt Peak || Spacewatch || — || align=right | 4.7 km || 
|-id=654 bgcolor=#d6d6d6
| 187654 ||  || — || March 10, 2007 || Kitt Peak || Spacewatch || — || align=right | 5.4 km || 
|-id=655 bgcolor=#C2FFFF
| 187655 ||  || — || March 11, 2007 || Mount Lemmon || Mount Lemmon Survey || L5 || align=right | 13 km || 
|-id=656 bgcolor=#C2FFFF
| 187656 ||  || — || March 11, 2007 || Kitt Peak || Spacewatch || L5 || align=right | 10 km || 
|-id=657 bgcolor=#C2FFFF
| 187657 ||  || — || March 12, 2007 || Mount Lemmon || Mount Lemmon Survey || L5 || align=right | 11 km || 
|-id=658 bgcolor=#E9E9E9
| 187658 ||  || — || March 15, 2007 || Mount Lemmon || Mount Lemmon Survey || — || align=right | 2.6 km || 
|-id=659 bgcolor=#C2FFFF
| 187659 ||  || — || March 15, 2007 || Mount Lemmon || Mount Lemmon Survey || L5 || align=right | 12 km || 
|-id=660 bgcolor=#d6d6d6
| 187660 ||  || — || May 9, 2007 || Mount Lemmon || Mount Lemmon Survey || HYG || align=right | 4.3 km || 
|-id=661 bgcolor=#C7FF8F
| 187661 ||  || — || May 10, 2007 || Palomar || M. E. Schwamb, M. E. Brown, D. L. Rabinowitz || centaur || align=right | 64 km || 
|-id=662 bgcolor=#d6d6d6
| 187662 ||  || — || May 10, 2007 || Mount Lemmon || Mount Lemmon Survey || — || align=right | 3.3 km || 
|-id=663 bgcolor=#fefefe
| 187663 ||  || — || November 18, 2007 || Mount Lemmon || Mount Lemmon Survey || — || align=right | 1.1 km || 
|-id=664 bgcolor=#E9E9E9
| 187664 ||  || — || November 20, 2007 || Mount Lemmon || Mount Lemmon Survey || — || align=right | 4.0 km || 
|-id=665 bgcolor=#d6d6d6
| 187665 ||  || — || January 11, 2008 || Kitt Peak || Spacewatch || — || align=right | 3.6 km || 
|-id=666 bgcolor=#d6d6d6
| 187666 ||  || — || January 30, 2008 || Mount Lemmon || Mount Lemmon Survey || — || align=right | 2.9 km || 
|-id=667 bgcolor=#fefefe
| 187667 ||  || — || January 31, 2008 || Mount Lemmon || Mount Lemmon Survey || NYS || align=right data-sort-value="0.94" | 940 m || 
|-id=668 bgcolor=#fefefe
| 187668 ||  || — || January 30, 2008 || OAM || OAM Obs. || — || align=right data-sort-value="0.91" | 910 m || 
|-id=669 bgcolor=#d6d6d6
| 187669 Obastromca ||  ||  || February 5, 2008 || OAM || OAM Obs. || — || align=right | 3.6 km || 
|-id=670 bgcolor=#E9E9E9
| 187670 ||  || — || February 3, 2008 || Kitt Peak || Spacewatch || — || align=right | 2.5 km || 
|-id=671 bgcolor=#fefefe
| 187671 ||  || — || February 2, 2008 || Kitt Peak || Spacewatch || MAS || align=right data-sort-value="0.96" | 960 m || 
|-id=672 bgcolor=#fefefe
| 187672 ||  || — || February 2, 2008 || Kitt Peak || Spacewatch || — || align=right | 1.0 km || 
|-id=673 bgcolor=#fefefe
| 187673 ||  || — || February 9, 2008 || RAS || W. G. Dillon || — || align=right data-sort-value="0.80" | 800 m || 
|-id=674 bgcolor=#fefefe
| 187674 ||  || — || February 10, 2008 || Bergisch Gladbach || W. Bickel || FLO || align=right data-sort-value="0.65" | 650 m || 
|-id=675 bgcolor=#E9E9E9
| 187675 ||  || — || February 7, 2008 || Kitt Peak || Spacewatch || AGN || align=right | 1.7 km || 
|-id=676 bgcolor=#d6d6d6
| 187676 ||  || — || February 8, 2008 || Kitt Peak || Spacewatch || — || align=right | 3.3 km || 
|-id=677 bgcolor=#E9E9E9
| 187677 ||  || — || February 8, 2008 || Kitt Peak || Spacewatch || — || align=right | 1.3 km || 
|-id=678 bgcolor=#d6d6d6
| 187678 ||  || — || February 9, 2008 || Kitt Peak || Spacewatch || — || align=right | 3.0 km || 
|-id=679 bgcolor=#fefefe
| 187679 Folinsbee ||  ||  || February 28, 2008 || RAS || A. Lowe || — || align=right | 1.1 km || 
|-id=680 bgcolor=#fefefe
| 187680 Stelck ||  ||  || February 28, 2008 || RAS || A. Lowe || — || align=right | 1.1 km || 
|-id=681 bgcolor=#d6d6d6
| 187681 ||  || — || February 26, 2008 || Kitt Peak || Spacewatch || — || align=right | 5.3 km || 
|-id=682 bgcolor=#E9E9E9
| 187682 ||  || — || February 26, 2008 || Kitt Peak || Spacewatch || — || align=right | 2.4 km || 
|-id=683 bgcolor=#E9E9E9
| 187683 ||  || — || February 26, 2008 || Mount Lemmon || Mount Lemmon Survey || MIS || align=right | 4.0 km || 
|-id=684 bgcolor=#fefefe
| 187684 ||  || — || February 27, 2008 || Mount Lemmon || Mount Lemmon Survey || — || align=right | 1.1 km || 
|-id=685 bgcolor=#fefefe
| 187685 ||  || — || February 28, 2008 || Kitt Peak || Spacewatch || — || align=right data-sort-value="0.81" | 810 m || 
|-id=686 bgcolor=#fefefe
| 187686 ||  || — || February 26, 2008 || Kitt Peak || Spacewatch || MAS || align=right | 1.0 km || 
|-id=687 bgcolor=#E9E9E9
| 187687 ||  || — || February 27, 2008 || Kitt Peak || Spacewatch || — || align=right | 2.3 km || 
|-id=688 bgcolor=#fefefe
| 187688 ||  || — || February 27, 2008 || Kitt Peak || Spacewatch || MAS || align=right | 1.3 km || 
|-id=689 bgcolor=#E9E9E9
| 187689 ||  || — || February 27, 2008 || Kitt Peak || Spacewatch || — || align=right | 1.4 km || 
|-id=690 bgcolor=#fefefe
| 187690 ||  || — || February 28, 2008 || Kitt Peak || Spacewatch || MAS || align=right | 1.1 km || 
|-id=691 bgcolor=#d6d6d6
| 187691 ||  || — || February 28, 2008 || Mount Lemmon || Mount Lemmon Survey || — || align=right | 3.1 km || 
|-id=692 bgcolor=#C2FFFF
| 187692 ||  || — || February 29, 2008 || Kitt Peak || Spacewatch || L5ENM || align=right | 15 km || 
|-id=693 bgcolor=#d6d6d6
| 187693 ||  || — || February 27, 2008 || Socorro || LINEAR || EOS || align=right | 2.4 km || 
|-id=694 bgcolor=#E9E9E9
| 187694 ||  || — || February 27, 2008 || Mount Lemmon || Mount Lemmon Survey || — || align=right | 1.7 km || 
|-id=695 bgcolor=#E9E9E9
| 187695 ||  || — || February 29, 2008 || Kitt Peak || Spacewatch || — || align=right | 1.9 km || 
|-id=696 bgcolor=#E9E9E9
| 187696 ||  || — || February 29, 2008 || Kitt Peak || Spacewatch || — || align=right | 2.0 km || 
|-id=697 bgcolor=#d6d6d6
| 187697 ||  || — || February 27, 2008 || Mount Lemmon || Mount Lemmon Survey || — || align=right | 3.4 km || 
|-id=698 bgcolor=#E9E9E9
| 187698 ||  || — || February 28, 2008 || Catalina || CSS || — || align=right | 4.4 km || 
|-id=699 bgcolor=#fefefe
| 187699 ||  || — || March 3, 2008 || Chante-Perdrix || Chante-Perdrix Obs. || NYS || align=right | 1.1 km || 
|-id=700 bgcolor=#E9E9E9
| 187700 Zagreb ||  ||  || March 2, 2008 || OAM || OAM Obs. || — || align=right | 2.1 km || 
|}

187701–187800 

|-bgcolor=#E9E9E9
| 187701 ||  || — || March 1, 2008 || Kitt Peak || Spacewatch || HEN || align=right | 1.4 km || 
|-id=702 bgcolor=#fefefe
| 187702 ||  || — || March 2, 2008 || Kitt Peak || Spacewatch || — || align=right | 1.3 km || 
|-id=703 bgcolor=#E9E9E9
| 187703 ||  || — || March 2, 2008 || Kitt Peak || Spacewatch || AGN || align=right | 1.7 km || 
|-id=704 bgcolor=#fefefe
| 187704 ||  || — || March 3, 2008 || Mount Lemmon || Mount Lemmon Survey || — || align=right | 1.3 km || 
|-id=705 bgcolor=#fefefe
| 187705 ||  || — || March 4, 2008 || Mount Lemmon || Mount Lemmon Survey || — || align=right data-sort-value="0.90" | 900 m || 
|-id=706 bgcolor=#fefefe
| 187706 ||  || — || March 2, 2008 || Kitt Peak || Spacewatch || ERI || align=right | 1.9 km || 
|-id=707 bgcolor=#fefefe
| 187707 Nandaxianlin ||  ||  || March 2, 2008 || XuYi || PMO NEO || — || align=right | 1.2 km || 
|-id=708 bgcolor=#fefefe
| 187708 ||  || — || March 3, 2008 || Kitt Peak || Spacewatch || NYS || align=right data-sort-value="0.78" | 780 m || 
|-id=709 bgcolor=#d6d6d6
| 187709 Fengduan ||  ||  || March 3, 2008 || XuYi || PMO NEO || KOR || align=right | 2.2 km || 
|-id=710 bgcolor=#E9E9E9
| 187710 ||  || — || March 5, 2008 || Mount Lemmon || Mount Lemmon Survey || — || align=right | 1.2 km || 
|-id=711 bgcolor=#d6d6d6
| 187711 ||  || — || March 5, 2008 || Kitt Peak || Spacewatch || — || align=right | 2.9 km || 
|-id=712 bgcolor=#fefefe
| 187712 ||  || — || March 6, 2008 || Kitt Peak || Spacewatch || NYS || align=right data-sort-value="0.82" | 820 m || 
|-id=713 bgcolor=#E9E9E9
| 187713 ||  || — || March 7, 2008 || Catalina || CSS || — || align=right | 2.2 km || 
|-id=714 bgcolor=#E9E9E9
| 187714 ||  || — || March 7, 2008 || Kitt Peak || Spacewatch || — || align=right | 1.2 km || 
|-id=715 bgcolor=#d6d6d6
| 187715 ||  || — || March 7, 2008 || Kitt Peak || Spacewatch || — || align=right | 3.0 km || 
|-id=716 bgcolor=#fefefe
| 187716 ||  || — || March 10, 2008 || Kitt Peak || Spacewatch || — || align=right data-sort-value="0.96" | 960 m || 
|-id=717 bgcolor=#fefefe
| 187717 ||  || — || March 5, 2008 || Socorro || LINEAR || NYS || align=right data-sort-value="0.85" | 850 m || 
|-id=718 bgcolor=#d6d6d6
| 187718 ||  || — || March 8, 2008 || Socorro || LINEAR || — || align=right | 4.7 km || 
|-id=719 bgcolor=#d6d6d6
| 187719 ||  || — || March 8, 2008 || Socorro || LINEAR || EOS || align=right | 6.5 km || 
|-id=720 bgcolor=#d6d6d6
| 187720 ||  || — || March 7, 2008 || Catalina || CSS || — || align=right | 3.9 km || 
|-id=721 bgcolor=#d6d6d6
| 187721 ||  || — || March 9, 2008 || Kitt Peak || Spacewatch || — || align=right | 3.5 km || 
|-id=722 bgcolor=#fefefe
| 187722 ||  || — || March 11, 2008 || Kitt Peak || Spacewatch || — || align=right data-sort-value="0.89" | 890 m || 
|-id=723 bgcolor=#E9E9E9
| 187723 ||  || — || March 5, 2008 || Mount Lemmon || Mount Lemmon Survey || — || align=right | 1.8 km || 
|-id=724 bgcolor=#C2FFFF
| 187724 ||  || — || March 28, 2008 || Kitt Peak || Spacewatch || L5 || align=right | 15 km || 
|-id=725 bgcolor=#E9E9E9
| 187725 ||  || — || March 28, 2008 || Kitt Peak || Spacewatch || — || align=right | 1.4 km || 
|-id=726 bgcolor=#fefefe
| 187726 ||  || — || March 28, 2008 || Mount Lemmon || Mount Lemmon Survey || NYS || align=right data-sort-value="0.83" | 830 m || 
|-id=727 bgcolor=#fefefe
| 187727 ||  || — || March 28, 2008 || Mount Lemmon || Mount Lemmon Survey || — || align=right data-sort-value="0.89" | 890 m || 
|-id=728 bgcolor=#d6d6d6
| 187728 ||  || — || March 28, 2008 || Mount Lemmon || Mount Lemmon Survey || — || align=right | 2.9 km || 
|-id=729 bgcolor=#d6d6d6
| 187729 ||  || — || March 30, 2008 || Catalina || CSS || URS || align=right | 6.6 km || 
|-id=730 bgcolor=#d6d6d6
| 187730 ||  || — || March 28, 2008 || Kitt Peak || Spacewatch || THM || align=right | 2.9 km || 
|-id=731 bgcolor=#E9E9E9
| 187731 ||  || — || March 31, 2008 || Catalina || CSS || — || align=right | 3.2 km || 
|-id=732 bgcolor=#d6d6d6
| 187732 ||  || — || March 27, 2008 || Mount Lemmon || Mount Lemmon Survey || URS || align=right | 3.8 km || 
|-id=733 bgcolor=#d6d6d6
| 187733 ||  || — || March 27, 2008 || Mount Lemmon || Mount Lemmon Survey || — || align=right | 3.5 km || 
|-id=734 bgcolor=#E9E9E9
| 187734 ||  || — || March 30, 2008 || Kitt Peak || Spacewatch || — || align=right | 1.4 km || 
|-id=735 bgcolor=#E9E9E9
| 187735 ||  || — || March 31, 2008 || Kitt Peak || Spacewatch || — || align=right | 1.4 km || 
|-id=736 bgcolor=#fefefe
| 187736 ||  || — || March 31, 2008 || Kitt Peak || Spacewatch || — || align=right | 1.1 km || 
|-id=737 bgcolor=#FA8072
| 187737 || 2153 P-L || — || September 24, 1960 || Palomar || PLS || — || align=right data-sort-value="0.84" | 840 m || 
|-id=738 bgcolor=#fefefe
| 187738 || 5031 P-L || — || October 17, 1960 || Palomar || PLS || FLO || align=right | 1.0 km || 
|-id=739 bgcolor=#d6d6d6
| 187739 || 1168 T-1 || — || March 25, 1971 || Palomar || PLS || — || align=right | 3.8 km || 
|-id=740 bgcolor=#fefefe
| 187740 || 1224 T-2 || — || September 29, 1973 || Palomar || PLS || — || align=right | 1.3 km || 
|-id=741 bgcolor=#E9E9E9
| 187741 || 2100 T-3 || — || October 16, 1977 || Palomar || PLS || HNS || align=right | 1.5 km || 
|-id=742 bgcolor=#fefefe
| 187742 || 2351 T-3 || — || October 16, 1977 || Palomar || PLS || V || align=right | 1.1 km || 
|-id=743 bgcolor=#E9E9E9
| 187743 || 3562 T-3 || — || October 16, 1977 || Palomar || PLS || HOF || align=right | 3.7 km || 
|-id=744 bgcolor=#fefefe
| 187744 || 4085 T-3 || — || October 16, 1977 || Palomar || PLS || — || align=right | 1.1 km || 
|-id=745 bgcolor=#E9E9E9
| 187745 || 5137 T-3 || — || October 16, 1977 || Palomar || PLS || — || align=right | 3.5 km || 
|-id=746 bgcolor=#FA8072
| 187746 || 1976 DC || — || February 27, 1976 || La Silla || R. M. West || — || align=right | 1.5 km || 
|-id=747 bgcolor=#fefefe
| 187747 ||  || — || March 21, 1993 || La Silla || UESAC || — || align=right | 1.2 km || 
|-id=748 bgcolor=#fefefe
| 187748 ||  || — || March 19, 1993 || La Silla || UESAC || NYS || align=right | 1.0 km || 
|-id=749 bgcolor=#fefefe
| 187749 ||  || — || March 19, 1993 || La Silla || UESAC || MAS || align=right | 1.0 km || 
|-id=750 bgcolor=#fefefe
| 187750 ||  || — || November 28, 1994 || Kitt Peak || Spacewatch || V || align=right data-sort-value="0.86" | 860 m || 
|-id=751 bgcolor=#E9E9E9
| 187751 ||  || — || April 2, 1995 || Kitt Peak || Spacewatch || — || align=right | 2.1 km || 
|-id=752 bgcolor=#fefefe
| 187752 ||  || — || June 24, 1995 || Kitt Peak || Spacewatch || FLO || align=right data-sort-value="0.77" | 770 m || 
|-id=753 bgcolor=#d6d6d6
| 187753 ||  || — || September 22, 1995 || Kitt Peak || Spacewatch || — || align=right | 2.5 km || 
|-id=754 bgcolor=#E9E9E9
| 187754 ||  || — || December 16, 1995 || Kitt Peak || Spacewatch || — || align=right | 3.1 km || 
|-id=755 bgcolor=#C2FFFF
| 187755 ||  || — || April 18, 1996 || La Silla || E. W. Elst || L5 || align=right | 12 km || 
|-id=756 bgcolor=#E9E9E9
| 187756 ||  || — || September 15, 1996 || Kitt Peak || Spacewatch || — || align=right | 2.1 km || 
|-id=757 bgcolor=#fefefe
| 187757 ||  || — || October 29, 1996 || Xinglong || SCAP || — || align=right | 1.1 km || 
|-id=758 bgcolor=#fefefe
| 187758 ||  || — || November 4, 1996 || Kitt Peak || Spacewatch || — || align=right | 1.0 km || 
|-id=759 bgcolor=#E9E9E9
| 187759 ||  || — || December 1, 1996 || Kitt Peak || Spacewatch || WIT || align=right | 1.4 km || 
|-id=760 bgcolor=#d6d6d6
| 187760 ||  || — || January 31, 1997 || Kitt Peak || Spacewatch || — || align=right | 2.5 km || 
|-id=761 bgcolor=#d6d6d6
| 187761 ||  || — || July 8, 1997 || Caussols || ODAS || — || align=right | 5.4 km || 
|-id=762 bgcolor=#E9E9E9
| 187762 ||  || — || November 23, 1997 || Kitt Peak || Spacewatch || — || align=right | 1.1 km || 
|-id=763 bgcolor=#fefefe
| 187763 ||  || — || January 22, 1998 || Kitt Peak || Spacewatch || — || align=right data-sort-value="0.90" | 900 m || 
|-id=764 bgcolor=#E9E9E9
| 187764 ||  || — || January 22, 1998 || Kitt Peak || Spacewatch || HOF || align=right | 3.8 km || 
|-id=765 bgcolor=#E9E9E9
| 187765 ||  || — || January 29, 1998 || Kitt Peak || Spacewatch || — || align=right | 2.5 km || 
|-id=766 bgcolor=#E9E9E9
| 187766 ||  || — || February 23, 1998 || Kitt Peak || Spacewatch || AGN || align=right | 1.4 km || 
|-id=767 bgcolor=#d6d6d6
| 187767 ||  || — || August 22, 1998 || Xinglong || SCAP || — || align=right | 4.9 km || 
|-id=768 bgcolor=#d6d6d6
| 187768 ||  || — || August 24, 1998 || Socorro || LINEAR || — || align=right | 5.6 km || 
|-id=769 bgcolor=#d6d6d6
| 187769 ||  || — || September 14, 1998 || Socorro || LINEAR || — || align=right | 4.6 km || 
|-id=770 bgcolor=#fefefe
| 187770 ||  || — || September 14, 1998 || Socorro || LINEAR || KLI || align=right | 3.7 km || 
|-id=771 bgcolor=#fefefe
| 187771 ||  || — || September 14, 1998 || Socorro || LINEAR || — || align=right | 1.00 km || 
|-id=772 bgcolor=#fefefe
| 187772 ||  || — || September 14, 1998 || Socorro || LINEAR || NYS || align=right data-sort-value="0.94" | 940 m || 
|-id=773 bgcolor=#fefefe
| 187773 ||  || — || September 14, 1998 || Socorro || LINEAR || NYS || align=right | 1.1 km || 
|-id=774 bgcolor=#d6d6d6
| 187774 ||  || — || September 20, 1998 || Kitt Peak || Spacewatch || — || align=right | 4.7 km || 
|-id=775 bgcolor=#fefefe
| 187775 ||  || — || September 21, 1998 || Kitt Peak || Spacewatch || — || align=right | 1.4 km || 
|-id=776 bgcolor=#FA8072
| 187776 ||  || — || September 16, 1998 || Anderson Mesa || LONEOS || — || align=right | 1.2 km || 
|-id=777 bgcolor=#d6d6d6
| 187777 ||  || — || September 21, 1998 || La Silla || E. W. Elst || — || align=right | 4.8 km || 
|-id=778 bgcolor=#fefefe
| 187778 ||  || — || September 26, 1998 || Socorro || LINEAR || — || align=right | 1.1 km || 
|-id=779 bgcolor=#fefefe
| 187779 ||  || — || September 26, 1998 || Socorro || LINEAR || V || align=right | 1.1 km || 
|-id=780 bgcolor=#fefefe
| 187780 ||  || — || September 26, 1998 || Socorro || LINEAR || — || align=right | 2.4 km || 
|-id=781 bgcolor=#fefefe
| 187781 ||  || — || September 26, 1998 || Socorro || LINEAR || — || align=right | 1.4 km || 
|-id=782 bgcolor=#fefefe
| 187782 ||  || — || September 26, 1998 || Socorro || LINEAR || — || align=right | 1.5 km || 
|-id=783 bgcolor=#d6d6d6
| 187783 ||  || — || September 26, 1998 || Socorro || LINEAR || — || align=right | 5.7 km || 
|-id=784 bgcolor=#fefefe
| 187784 ||  || — || September 26, 1998 || Socorro || LINEAR || NYS || align=right | 1.2 km || 
|-id=785 bgcolor=#fefefe
| 187785 ||  || — || September 26, 1998 || Socorro || LINEAR || V || align=right | 1.1 km || 
|-id=786 bgcolor=#fefefe
| 187786 ||  || — || September 22, 1998 || Anderson Mesa || LONEOS || — || align=right | 1.3 km || 
|-id=787 bgcolor=#d6d6d6
| 187787 ||  || — || September 17, 1998 || Anderson Mesa || LONEOS || — || align=right | 5.0 km || 
|-id=788 bgcolor=#fefefe
| 187788 ||  || — || September 22, 1998 || Anderson Mesa || LONEOS || V || align=right | 1.1 km || 
|-id=789 bgcolor=#fefefe
| 187789 ||  || — || October 22, 1998 || Xinglong || SCAP || H || align=right data-sort-value="0.77" | 770 m || 
|-id=790 bgcolor=#d6d6d6
| 187790 ||  || — || October 28, 1998 || Socorro || LINEAR || HYG || align=right | 5.1 km || 
|-id=791 bgcolor=#fefefe
| 187791 ||  || — || November 10, 1998 || Socorro || LINEAR || H || align=right | 1.0 km || 
|-id=792 bgcolor=#E9E9E9
| 187792 ||  || — || January 10, 1999 || Oizumi || T. Kobayashi || — || align=right | 2.0 km || 
|-id=793 bgcolor=#E9E9E9
| 187793 ||  || — || January 23, 1999 || Višnjan Observatory || K. Korlević || — || align=right | 1.7 km || 
|-id=794 bgcolor=#E9E9E9
| 187794 ||  || — || February 10, 1999 || Socorro || LINEAR || — || align=right | 1.9 km || 
|-id=795 bgcolor=#E9E9E9
| 187795 ||  || — || February 10, 1999 || Socorro || LINEAR || — || align=right | 2.7 km || 
|-id=796 bgcolor=#E9E9E9
| 187796 ||  || — || February 8, 1999 || Kitt Peak || Spacewatch || — || align=right | 1.5 km || 
|-id=797 bgcolor=#d6d6d6
| 187797 ||  || — || February 7, 1999 || Kitt Peak || Spacewatch || — || align=right | 4.6 km || 
|-id=798 bgcolor=#E9E9E9
| 187798 ||  || — || March 20, 1999 || Kitt Peak || Spacewatch || — || align=right | 2.5 km || 
|-id=799 bgcolor=#d6d6d6
| 187799 ||  || — || March 21, 1999 || Kitt Peak || Spacewatch || Tj (2.88) || align=right | 7.3 km || 
|-id=800 bgcolor=#E9E9E9
| 187800 ||  || — || April 14, 1999 || Kitt Peak || Spacewatch || — || align=right | 2.0 km || 
|}

187801–187900 

|-bgcolor=#E9E9E9
| 187801 ||  || — || April 18, 1999 || Kitt Peak || Spacewatch || MIT || align=right | 3.0 km || 
|-id=802 bgcolor=#E9E9E9
| 187802 ||  || — || May 8, 1999 || Xinglong || SCAP || JUN || align=right | 1.5 km || 
|-id=803 bgcolor=#E9E9E9
| 187803 ||  || — || May 14, 1999 || Socorro || LINEAR || — || align=right | 3.2 km || 
|-id=804 bgcolor=#d6d6d6
| 187804 ||  || — || July 22, 1999 || Socorro || LINEAR || 627 || align=right | 7.2 km || 
|-id=805 bgcolor=#fefefe
| 187805 ||  || — || September 8, 1999 || Bologna || San Vittore Obs. || — || align=right data-sort-value="0.91" | 910 m || 
|-id=806 bgcolor=#E9E9E9
| 187806 ||  || — || September 7, 1999 || Socorro || LINEAR || — || align=right | 3.5 km || 
|-id=807 bgcolor=#d6d6d6
| 187807 ||  || — || September 9, 1999 || Socorro || LINEAR || — || align=right | 4.0 km || 
|-id=808 bgcolor=#fefefe
| 187808 ||  || — || September 13, 1999 || Kitt Peak || Spacewatch || — || align=right | 1.1 km || 
|-id=809 bgcolor=#fefefe
| 187809 ||  || — || October 14, 1999 || Ondřejov || L. Kotková || FLO || align=right | 1.6 km || 
|-id=810 bgcolor=#d6d6d6
| 187810 ||  || — || October 10, 1999 || Xinglong || SCAP || — || align=right | 4.0 km || 
|-id=811 bgcolor=#d6d6d6
| 187811 ||  || — || October 10, 1999 || Kitt Peak || Spacewatch || — || align=right | 3.4 km || 
|-id=812 bgcolor=#d6d6d6
| 187812 ||  || — || October 6, 1999 || Socorro || LINEAR || — || align=right | 3.4 km || 
|-id=813 bgcolor=#d6d6d6
| 187813 ||  || — || October 7, 1999 || Socorro || LINEAR || — || align=right | 3.5 km || 
|-id=814 bgcolor=#fefefe
| 187814 ||  || — || October 9, 1999 || Socorro || LINEAR || FLO || align=right data-sort-value="0.97" | 970 m || 
|-id=815 bgcolor=#d6d6d6
| 187815 ||  || — || October 10, 1999 || Socorro || LINEAR || EOS || align=right | 3.5 km || 
|-id=816 bgcolor=#d6d6d6
| 187816 ||  || — || October 10, 1999 || Socorro || LINEAR || — || align=right | 4.7 km || 
|-id=817 bgcolor=#fefefe
| 187817 ||  || — || October 2, 1999 || Kitt Peak || Spacewatch || — || align=right data-sort-value="0.92" | 920 m || 
|-id=818 bgcolor=#fefefe
| 187818 ||  || — || October 3, 1999 || Catalina || CSS || — || align=right | 1.1 km || 
|-id=819 bgcolor=#fefefe
| 187819 ||  || — || October 7, 1999 || Catalina || CSS || — || align=right data-sort-value="0.69" | 690 m || 
|-id=820 bgcolor=#d6d6d6
| 187820 ||  || — || October 10, 1999 || Socorro || LINEAR || — || align=right | 4.5 km || 
|-id=821 bgcolor=#d6d6d6
| 187821 ||  || — || October 11, 1999 || Kitt Peak || Spacewatch || — || align=right | 6.1 km || 
|-id=822 bgcolor=#fefefe
| 187822 ||  || — || October 30, 1999 || Socorro || LINEAR || PHO || align=right | 5.4 km || 
|-id=823 bgcolor=#fefefe
| 187823 ||  || — || October 29, 1999 || Catalina || CSS || — || align=right | 1.3 km || 
|-id=824 bgcolor=#d6d6d6
| 187824 ||  || — || October 31, 1999 || Kitt Peak || Spacewatch || — || align=right | 6.0 km || 
|-id=825 bgcolor=#d6d6d6
| 187825 ||  || — || October 31, 1999 || Kitt Peak || Spacewatch || HYG || align=right | 3.1 km || 
|-id=826 bgcolor=#d6d6d6
| 187826 ||  || — || October 31, 1999 || Kitt Peak || Spacewatch || — || align=right | 3.8 km || 
|-id=827 bgcolor=#fefefe
| 187827 ||  || — || October 31, 1999 || Kitt Peak || Spacewatch || — || align=right | 1.1 km || 
|-id=828 bgcolor=#FA8072
| 187828 ||  || — || November 12, 1999 || Višnjan Observatory || K. Korlević || — || align=right | 1.1 km || 
|-id=829 bgcolor=#d6d6d6
| 187829 ||  || — || November 4, 1999 || Socorro || LINEAR || — || align=right | 4.5 km || 
|-id=830 bgcolor=#fefefe
| 187830 ||  || — || November 4, 1999 || Socorro || LINEAR || FLO || align=right data-sort-value="0.77" | 770 m || 
|-id=831 bgcolor=#d6d6d6
| 187831 ||  || — || November 9, 1999 || Socorro || LINEAR || — || align=right | 3.5 km || 
|-id=832 bgcolor=#d6d6d6
| 187832 ||  || — || November 9, 1999 || Socorro || LINEAR || — || align=right | 5.0 km || 
|-id=833 bgcolor=#d6d6d6
| 187833 ||  || — || November 9, 1999 || Socorro || LINEAR || CRO || align=right | 5.3 km || 
|-id=834 bgcolor=#d6d6d6
| 187834 ||  || — || November 4, 1999 || Kitt Peak || Spacewatch || — || align=right | 3.6 km || 
|-id=835 bgcolor=#d6d6d6
| 187835 ||  || — || November 10, 1999 || Kitt Peak || Spacewatch || EMA || align=right | 5.9 km || 
|-id=836 bgcolor=#d6d6d6
| 187836 ||  || — || November 13, 1999 || Socorro || LINEAR || EOS || align=right | 3.4 km || 
|-id=837 bgcolor=#fefefe
| 187837 ||  || — || November 11, 1999 || Kitt Peak || Spacewatch || — || align=right data-sort-value="0.92" | 920 m || 
|-id=838 bgcolor=#fefefe
| 187838 ||  || — || November 14, 1999 || Socorro || LINEAR || — || align=right | 1.3 km || 
|-id=839 bgcolor=#d6d6d6
| 187839 ||  || — || November 15, 1999 || Socorro || LINEAR || — || align=right | 6.8 km || 
|-id=840 bgcolor=#fefefe
| 187840 ||  || — || November 15, 1999 || Socorro || LINEAR || — || align=right data-sort-value="0.98" | 980 m || 
|-id=841 bgcolor=#d6d6d6
| 187841 ||  || — || November 9, 1999 || Kitt Peak || Spacewatch || — || align=right | 3.1 km || 
|-id=842 bgcolor=#d6d6d6
| 187842 ||  || — || November 5, 1999 || Socorro || LINEAR || — || align=right | 4.3 km || 
|-id=843 bgcolor=#d6d6d6
| 187843 ||  || — || December 7, 1999 || Socorro || LINEAR || — || align=right | 5.5 km || 
|-id=844 bgcolor=#fefefe
| 187844 ||  || — || December 7, 1999 || Socorro || LINEAR || — || align=right | 1.0 km || 
|-id=845 bgcolor=#d6d6d6
| 187845 ||  || — || December 4, 1999 || Catalina || CSS || — || align=right | 4.1 km || 
|-id=846 bgcolor=#fefefe
| 187846 ||  || — || December 8, 1999 || Socorro || LINEAR || — || align=right | 1.5 km || 
|-id=847 bgcolor=#d6d6d6
| 187847 ||  || — || December 4, 1999 || Kitt Peak || Spacewatch || EUP || align=right | 5.8 km || 
|-id=848 bgcolor=#fefefe
| 187848 ||  || — || December 5, 1999 || Socorro || LINEAR || — || align=right | 2.2 km || 
|-id=849 bgcolor=#fefefe
| 187849 ||  || — || December 6, 1999 || Socorro || LINEAR || — || align=right | 1.3 km || 
|-id=850 bgcolor=#fefefe
| 187850 ||  || — || January 5, 2000 || Socorro || LINEAR || — || align=right | 1.3 km || 
|-id=851 bgcolor=#fefefe
| 187851 ||  || — || January 11, 2000 || Prescott || P. G. Comba || FLO || align=right data-sort-value="0.94" | 940 m || 
|-id=852 bgcolor=#FA8072
| 187852 ||  || — || January 7, 2000 || Socorro || LINEAR || — || align=right | 1.0 km || 
|-id=853 bgcolor=#d6d6d6
| 187853 ||  || — || January 11, 2000 || Kitt Peak || Spacewatch || — || align=right | 5.8 km || 
|-id=854 bgcolor=#fefefe
| 187854 ||  || — || January 7, 2000 || Kitt Peak || Spacewatch || MAS || align=right data-sort-value="0.76" | 760 m || 
|-id=855 bgcolor=#fefefe
| 187855 ||  || — || April 4, 2000 || Socorro || LINEAR || H || align=right data-sort-value="0.83" | 830 m || 
|-id=856 bgcolor=#E9E9E9
| 187856 ||  || — || April 6, 2000 || Anderson Mesa || LONEOS || KON || align=right | 3.2 km || 
|-id=857 bgcolor=#fefefe
| 187857 ||  || — || April 27, 2000 || Socorro || LINEAR || H || align=right data-sort-value="0.82" | 820 m || 
|-id=858 bgcolor=#fefefe
| 187858 ||  || — || April 28, 2000 || Socorro || LINEAR || — || align=right | 2.0 km || 
|-id=859 bgcolor=#fefefe
| 187859 ||  || — || April 25, 2000 || Anderson Mesa || LONEOS || H || align=right data-sort-value="0.78" | 780 m || 
|-id=860 bgcolor=#fefefe
| 187860 ||  || — || May 7, 2000 || Socorro || LINEAR || H || align=right data-sort-value="0.94" | 940 m || 
|-id=861 bgcolor=#E9E9E9
| 187861 ||  || — || May 28, 2000 || Socorro || LINEAR || — || align=right | 1.4 km || 
|-id=862 bgcolor=#E9E9E9
| 187862 ||  || — || June 7, 2000 || Socorro || LINEAR || BRU || align=right | 5.5 km || 
|-id=863 bgcolor=#E9E9E9
| 187863 ||  || — || June 11, 2000 || Socorro || LINEAR || BAR || align=right | 2.9 km || 
|-id=864 bgcolor=#E9E9E9
| 187864 ||  || — || July 3, 2000 || Kitt Peak || Spacewatch || — || align=right | 1.6 km || 
|-id=865 bgcolor=#E9E9E9
| 187865 ||  || — || July 29, 2000 || Anderson Mesa || LONEOS || — || align=right | 1.7 km || 
|-id=866 bgcolor=#E9E9E9
| 187866 ||  || — || July 29, 2000 || Anderson Mesa || LONEOS || — || align=right | 3.0 km || 
|-id=867 bgcolor=#E9E9E9
| 187867 ||  || — || July 29, 2000 || Anderson Mesa || LONEOS || — || align=right | 2.3 km || 
|-id=868 bgcolor=#E9E9E9
| 187868 ||  || — || August 1, 2000 || Socorro || LINEAR || — || align=right | 1.5 km || 
|-id=869 bgcolor=#E9E9E9
| 187869 ||  || — || August 24, 2000 || Socorro || LINEAR || MAR || align=right | 1.9 km || 
|-id=870 bgcolor=#E9E9E9
| 187870 ||  || — || August 28, 2000 || Socorro || LINEAR || — || align=right | 2.7 km || 
|-id=871 bgcolor=#E9E9E9
| 187871 ||  || — || August 28, 2000 || Socorro || LINEAR || — || align=right | 5.0 km || 
|-id=872 bgcolor=#E9E9E9
| 187872 ||  || — || August 24, 2000 || Socorro || LINEAR || MIT || align=right | 3.8 km || 
|-id=873 bgcolor=#E9E9E9
| 187873 ||  || — || August 24, 2000 || Socorro || LINEAR || MIS || align=right | 3.5 km || 
|-id=874 bgcolor=#E9E9E9
| 187874 ||  || — || August 25, 2000 || Socorro || LINEAR || — || align=right | 2.1 km || 
|-id=875 bgcolor=#E9E9E9
| 187875 ||  || — || August 25, 2000 || Socorro || LINEAR || — || align=right | 2.8 km || 
|-id=876 bgcolor=#E9E9E9
| 187876 ||  || — || August 28, 2000 || Socorro || LINEAR || JUN || align=right | 2.2 km || 
|-id=877 bgcolor=#E9E9E9
| 187877 ||  || — || August 25, 2000 || Socorro || LINEAR || BAR || align=right | 2.2 km || 
|-id=878 bgcolor=#E9E9E9
| 187878 ||  || — || August 25, 2000 || Socorro || LINEAR || — || align=right | 3.1 km || 
|-id=879 bgcolor=#E9E9E9
| 187879 ||  || — || August 31, 2000 || Socorro || LINEAR || — || align=right | 2.4 km || 
|-id=880 bgcolor=#E9E9E9
| 187880 ||  || — || August 31, 2000 || Socorro || LINEAR || — || align=right | 3.6 km || 
|-id=881 bgcolor=#E9E9E9
| 187881 ||  || — || August 31, 2000 || Socorro || LINEAR || AEO || align=right | 1.6 km || 
|-id=882 bgcolor=#E9E9E9
| 187882 ||  || — || August 31, 2000 || Kitt Peak || Spacewatch || — || align=right | 1.4 km || 
|-id=883 bgcolor=#E9E9E9
| 187883 || 2000 RW || — || September 1, 2000 || Socorro || LINEAR || — || align=right | 1.8 km || 
|-id=884 bgcolor=#E9E9E9
| 187884 ||  || — || September 3, 2000 || Socorro || LINEAR || — || align=right | 2.3 km || 
|-id=885 bgcolor=#E9E9E9
| 187885 ||  || — || September 7, 2000 || Bisei SG Center || BATTeRS || — || align=right | 2.8 km || 
|-id=886 bgcolor=#E9E9E9
| 187886 ||  || — || September 7, 2000 || Socorro || LINEAR || IAN || align=right | 2.4 km || 
|-id=887 bgcolor=#E9E9E9
| 187887 ||  || — || September 1, 2000 || Socorro || LINEAR || JUN || align=right | 1.7 km || 
|-id=888 bgcolor=#E9E9E9
| 187888 ||  || — || September 2, 2000 || Socorro || LINEAR || — || align=right | 4.2 km || 
|-id=889 bgcolor=#E9E9E9
| 187889 ||  || — || September 22, 2000 || Socorro || LINEAR || — || align=right | 1.7 km || 
|-id=890 bgcolor=#E9E9E9
| 187890 ||  || — || September 24, 2000 || Socorro || LINEAR || GEF || align=right | 1.8 km || 
|-id=891 bgcolor=#E9E9E9
| 187891 ||  || — || September 23, 2000 || Socorro || LINEAR || — || align=right | 3.3 km || 
|-id=892 bgcolor=#E9E9E9
| 187892 ||  || — || September 24, 2000 || Socorro || LINEAR || — || align=right | 4.1 km || 
|-id=893 bgcolor=#E9E9E9
| 187893 ||  || — || September 24, 2000 || Socorro || LINEAR || — || align=right | 2.2 km || 
|-id=894 bgcolor=#E9E9E9
| 187894 ||  || — || September 23, 2000 || Socorro || LINEAR || GEF || align=right | 2.2 km || 
|-id=895 bgcolor=#E9E9E9
| 187895 ||  || — || September 23, 2000 || Socorro || LINEAR || — || align=right | 4.8 km || 
|-id=896 bgcolor=#E9E9E9
| 187896 ||  || — || September 22, 2000 || Haleakala || NEAT || — || align=right | 4.4 km || 
|-id=897 bgcolor=#E9E9E9
| 187897 ||  || — || September 24, 2000 || Socorro || LINEAR || — || align=right | 3.7 km || 
|-id=898 bgcolor=#E9E9E9
| 187898 ||  || — || September 25, 2000 || Socorro || LINEAR || — || align=right | 3.7 km || 
|-id=899 bgcolor=#E9E9E9
| 187899 ||  || — || September 24, 2000 || Socorro || LINEAR || JUN || align=right | 1.5 km || 
|-id=900 bgcolor=#E9E9E9
| 187900 ||  || — || September 26, 2000 || Socorro || LINEAR || MRX || align=right | 1.6 km || 
|}

187901–188000 

|-bgcolor=#E9E9E9
| 187901 ||  || — || September 30, 2000 || Socorro || LINEAR || EUN || align=right | 2.3 km || 
|-id=902 bgcolor=#E9E9E9
| 187902 ||  || — || September 25, 2000 || Socorro || LINEAR || — || align=right | 7.6 km || 
|-id=903 bgcolor=#E9E9E9
| 187903 ||  || — || September 24, 2000 || Socorro || LINEAR || — || align=right | 3.0 km || 
|-id=904 bgcolor=#E9E9E9
| 187904 ||  || — || September 22, 2000 || Anderson Mesa || LONEOS || — || align=right | 4.4 km || 
|-id=905 bgcolor=#E9E9E9
| 187905 ||  || — || October 1, 2000 || Socorro || LINEAR || — || align=right | 3.1 km || 
|-id=906 bgcolor=#E9E9E9
| 187906 ||  || — || October 1, 2000 || Socorro || LINEAR || — || align=right | 3.0 km || 
|-id=907 bgcolor=#E9E9E9
| 187907 ||  || — || October 24, 2000 || Socorro || LINEAR || — || align=right | 2.0 km || 
|-id=908 bgcolor=#d6d6d6
| 187908 ||  || — || October 25, 2000 || Socorro || LINEAR || — || align=right | 2.5 km || 
|-id=909 bgcolor=#E9E9E9
| 187909 ||  || — || October 25, 2000 || Socorro || LINEAR || — || align=right | 4.0 km || 
|-id=910 bgcolor=#E9E9E9
| 187910 ||  || — || October 25, 2000 || Socorro || LINEAR || — || align=right | 1.5 km || 
|-id=911 bgcolor=#d6d6d6
| 187911 ||  || — || October 31, 2000 || Socorro || LINEAR || EOS || align=right | 3.3 km || 
|-id=912 bgcolor=#d6d6d6
| 187912 ||  || — || November 1, 2000 || Kitt Peak || Spacewatch || — || align=right | 4.7 km || 
|-id=913 bgcolor=#d6d6d6
| 187913 ||  || — || November 1, 2000 || Socorro || LINEAR || — || align=right | 4.1 km || 
|-id=914 bgcolor=#E9E9E9
| 187914 ||  || — || November 1, 2000 || Socorro || LINEAR || — || align=right | 2.1 km || 
|-id=915 bgcolor=#d6d6d6
| 187915 ||  || — || November 3, 2000 || Socorro || LINEAR || EUP || align=right | 9.2 km || 
|-id=916 bgcolor=#E9E9E9
| 187916 ||  || — || November 3, 2000 || Socorro || LINEAR || — || align=right | 4.1 km || 
|-id=917 bgcolor=#E9E9E9
| 187917 ||  || — || November 21, 2000 || Eskridge || Farpoint Obs. || DOR || align=right | 3.7 km || 
|-id=918 bgcolor=#d6d6d6
| 187918 ||  || — || November 20, 2000 || Socorro || LINEAR || — || align=right | 6.9 km || 
|-id=919 bgcolor=#E9E9E9
| 187919 ||  || — || November 20, 2000 || Socorro || LINEAR || — || align=right | 4.1 km || 
|-id=920 bgcolor=#E9E9E9
| 187920 ||  || — || December 5, 2000 || Socorro || LINEAR || — || align=right | 3.4 km || 
|-id=921 bgcolor=#d6d6d6
| 187921 ||  || — || December 18, 2000 || Kitt Peak || Spacewatch || — || align=right | 3.1 km || 
|-id=922 bgcolor=#d6d6d6
| 187922 ||  || — || December 30, 2000 || Socorro || LINEAR || THM || align=right | 4.2 km || 
|-id=923 bgcolor=#d6d6d6
| 187923 ||  || — || December 30, 2000 || Socorro || LINEAR || — || align=right | 6.3 km || 
|-id=924 bgcolor=#fefefe
| 187924 ||  || — || December 30, 2000 || Socorro || LINEAR || — || align=right data-sort-value="0.98" | 980 m || 
|-id=925 bgcolor=#d6d6d6
| 187925 ||  || — || January 15, 2001 || Kitt Peak || Spacewatch || — || align=right | 3.0 km || 
|-id=926 bgcolor=#fefefe
| 187926 ||  || — || January 20, 2001 || Socorro || LINEAR || — || align=right | 1.4 km || 
|-id=927 bgcolor=#E9E9E9
| 187927 ||  || — || January 21, 2001 || Kitt Peak || Spacewatch || — || align=right | 3.4 km || 
|-id=928 bgcolor=#fefefe
| 187928 ||  || — || February 1, 2001 || Socorro || LINEAR || — || align=right | 1.2 km || 
|-id=929 bgcolor=#d6d6d6
| 187929 ||  || — || February 1, 2001 || Anderson Mesa || LONEOS || — || align=right | 5.3 km || 
|-id=930 bgcolor=#d6d6d6
| 187930 ||  || — || February 19, 2001 || Socorro || LINEAR || — || align=right | 6.1 km || 
|-id=931 bgcolor=#fefefe
| 187931 ||  || — || February 20, 2001 || Socorro || LINEAR || — || align=right | 1.3 km || 
|-id=932 bgcolor=#fefefe
| 187932 ||  || — || March 15, 2001 || Haleakala || NEAT || FLO || align=right | 1.0 km || 
|-id=933 bgcolor=#fefefe
| 187933 ||  || — || March 2, 2001 || Anderson Mesa || LONEOS || — || align=right | 1.2 km || 
|-id=934 bgcolor=#fefefe
| 187934 ||  || — || March 19, 2001 || Anderson Mesa || LONEOS || — || align=right | 1.3 km || 
|-id=935 bgcolor=#fefefe
| 187935 ||  || — || March 26, 2001 || Kitt Peak || Spacewatch || — || align=right data-sort-value="0.91" | 910 m || 
|-id=936 bgcolor=#fefefe
| 187936 ||  || — || March 27, 2001 || Anderson Mesa || LONEOS || — || align=right | 1.4 km || 
|-id=937 bgcolor=#fefefe
| 187937 ||  || — || March 20, 2001 || Haleakala || NEAT || — || align=right data-sort-value="0.81" | 810 m || 
|-id=938 bgcolor=#fefefe
| 187938 ||  || — || March 24, 2001 || Anderson Mesa || LONEOS || — || align=right | 1.2 km || 
|-id=939 bgcolor=#fefefe
| 187939 ||  || — || March 26, 2001 || Haleakala || NEAT || — || align=right | 1.3 km || 
|-id=940 bgcolor=#fefefe
| 187940 ||  || — || April 14, 2001 || Kitt Peak || Spacewatch || — || align=right data-sort-value="0.89" | 890 m || 
|-id=941 bgcolor=#fefefe
| 187941 ||  || — || April 15, 2001 || Socorro || LINEAR || FLO || align=right | 1.0 km || 
|-id=942 bgcolor=#fefefe
| 187942 ||  || — || May 17, 2001 || Socorro || LINEAR || FLO || align=right data-sort-value="0.95" | 950 m || 
|-id=943 bgcolor=#fefefe
| 187943 ||  || — || May 18, 2001 || Socorro || LINEAR || — || align=right | 1.2 km || 
|-id=944 bgcolor=#fefefe
| 187944 ||  || — || May 22, 2001 || Socorro || LINEAR || — || align=right | 1.6 km || 
|-id=945 bgcolor=#fefefe
| 187945 ||  || — || May 22, 2001 || Socorro || LINEAR || Vfast? || align=right | 1.0 km || 
|-id=946 bgcolor=#fefefe
| 187946 ||  || — || May 22, 2001 || Anderson Mesa || LONEOS || — || align=right | 1.0 km || 
|-id=947 bgcolor=#fefefe
| 187947 ||  || — || May 25, 2001 || Kitt Peak || Spacewatch || — || align=right | 1.4 km || 
|-id=948 bgcolor=#fefefe
| 187948 ||  || — || May 24, 2001 || Anderson Mesa || LONEOS || V || align=right | 1.1 km || 
|-id=949 bgcolor=#fefefe
| 187949 ||  || — || May 27, 2001 || Haleakala || NEAT || FLO || align=right data-sort-value="0.90" | 900 m || 
|-id=950 bgcolor=#fefefe
| 187950 ||  || — || June 19, 2001 || Haleakala || NEAT || — || align=right | 1.9 km || 
|-id=951 bgcolor=#fefefe
| 187951 || 2001 NL || — || July 9, 2001 || Palomar || NEAT || — || align=right | 1.5 km || 
|-id=952 bgcolor=#fefefe
| 187952 ||  || — || July 16, 2001 || Anderson Mesa || LONEOS || — || align=right | 1.4 km || 
|-id=953 bgcolor=#fefefe
| 187953 ||  || — || July 17, 2001 || Anderson Mesa || LONEOS || ERI || align=right | 3.1 km || 
|-id=954 bgcolor=#fefefe
| 187954 ||  || — || July 18, 2001 || Palomar || NEAT || MAS || align=right | 1.00 km || 
|-id=955 bgcolor=#fefefe
| 187955 ||  || — || July 19, 2001 || Palomar || NEAT || ERI || align=right | 3.2 km || 
|-id=956 bgcolor=#fefefe
| 187956 ||  || — || July 16, 2001 || Haleakala || NEAT || — || align=right | 2.3 km || 
|-id=957 bgcolor=#fefefe
| 187957 ||  || — || July 16, 2001 || Anderson Mesa || LONEOS || NYS || align=right | 1.2 km || 
|-id=958 bgcolor=#E9E9E9
| 187958 ||  || — || July 23, 2001 || Palomar || NEAT || HNS || align=right | 2.0 km || 
|-id=959 bgcolor=#fefefe
| 187959 ||  || — || July 23, 2001 || Haleakala || NEAT || MAS || align=right | 1.1 km || 
|-id=960 bgcolor=#fefefe
| 187960 || 2001 PM || — || August 5, 2001 || Palomar || NEAT || — || align=right | 1.1 km || 
|-id=961 bgcolor=#fefefe
| 187961 ||  || — || August 3, 2001 || Haleakala || NEAT || V || align=right | 1.2 km || 
|-id=962 bgcolor=#fefefe
| 187962 ||  || — || August 11, 2001 || Palomar || NEAT || — || align=right data-sort-value="0.98" | 980 m || 
|-id=963 bgcolor=#fefefe
| 187963 ||  || — || August 11, 2001 || Palomar || NEAT || — || align=right | 4.4 km || 
|-id=964 bgcolor=#fefefe
| 187964 ||  || — || August 15, 2001 || Haleakala || NEAT || — || align=right | 2.7 km || 
|-id=965 bgcolor=#fefefe
| 187965 ||  || — || August 16, 2001 || Socorro || LINEAR || — || align=right | 1.5 km || 
|-id=966 bgcolor=#fefefe
| 187966 ||  || — || August 16, 2001 || Socorro || LINEAR || NYS || align=right data-sort-value="0.94" | 940 m || 
|-id=967 bgcolor=#fefefe
| 187967 ||  || — || August 16, 2001 || Socorro || LINEAR || MAS || align=right data-sort-value="0.91" | 910 m || 
|-id=968 bgcolor=#fefefe
| 187968 ||  || — || August 16, 2001 || Socorro || LINEAR || NYS || align=right data-sort-value="0.92" | 920 m || 
|-id=969 bgcolor=#fefefe
| 187969 ||  || — || August 18, 2001 || Socorro || LINEAR || V || align=right data-sort-value="0.95" | 950 m || 
|-id=970 bgcolor=#fefefe
| 187970 ||  || — || August 17, 2001 || Socorro || LINEAR || — || align=right | 1.4 km || 
|-id=971 bgcolor=#fefefe
| 187971 ||  || — || August 19, 2001 || Socorro || LINEAR || — || align=right | 1.3 km || 
|-id=972 bgcolor=#fefefe
| 187972 ||  || — || August 19, 2001 || Socorro || LINEAR || — || align=right | 1.3 km || 
|-id=973 bgcolor=#fefefe
| 187973 ||  || — || August 25, 2001 || Socorro || LINEAR || — || align=right | 1.2 km || 
|-id=974 bgcolor=#E9E9E9
| 187974 ||  || — || August 17, 2001 || Socorro || LINEAR || — || align=right | 1.7 km || 
|-id=975 bgcolor=#fefefe
| 187975 ||  || — || August 23, 2001 || Anderson Mesa || LONEOS || — || align=right | 1.4 km || 
|-id=976 bgcolor=#E9E9E9
| 187976 ||  || — || August 26, 2001 || Haleakala || NEAT || — || align=right | 1.5 km || 
|-id=977 bgcolor=#fefefe
| 187977 ||  || — || August 23, 2001 || Anderson Mesa || LONEOS || NYS || align=right data-sort-value="0.83" | 830 m || 
|-id=978 bgcolor=#fefefe
| 187978 ||  || — || August 23, 2001 || Anderson Mesa || LONEOS || LCI || align=right | 1.4 km || 
|-id=979 bgcolor=#fefefe
| 187979 ||  || — || August 24, 2001 || Socorro || LINEAR || — || align=right | 1.2 km || 
|-id=980 bgcolor=#E9E9E9
| 187980 ||  || — || August 17, 2001 || Palomar || NEAT || EUN || align=right | 2.4 km || 
|-id=981 bgcolor=#E9E9E9
| 187981 Soluri ||  ||  || August 19, 2001 || Cerro Tololo || M. W. Buie || — || align=right | 1.2 km || 
|-id=982 bgcolor=#E9E9E9
| 187982 ||  || — || August 26, 2001 || Palomar || NEAT || EUN || align=right | 1.9 km || 
|-id=983 bgcolor=#fefefe
| 187983 ||  || — || September 8, 2001 || Socorro || LINEAR || V || align=right | 1.1 km || 
|-id=984 bgcolor=#E9E9E9
| 187984 ||  || — || September 8, 2001 || Socorro || LINEAR || — || align=right | 1.3 km || 
|-id=985 bgcolor=#fefefe
| 187985 ||  || — || September 8, 2001 || Socorro || LINEAR || — || align=right data-sort-value="0.78" | 780 m || 
|-id=986 bgcolor=#fefefe
| 187986 ||  || — || September 10, 2001 || Socorro || LINEAR || — || align=right | 1.4 km || 
|-id=987 bgcolor=#fefefe
| 187987 ||  || — || September 12, 2001 || Emerald Lane || L. Ball || NYS || align=right data-sort-value="0.83" | 830 m || 
|-id=988 bgcolor=#fefefe
| 187988 ||  || — || September 10, 2001 || Socorro || LINEAR || — || align=right | 2.8 km || 
|-id=989 bgcolor=#fefefe
| 187989 ||  || — || September 12, 2001 || Socorro || LINEAR || NYS || align=right data-sort-value="0.92" | 920 m || 
|-id=990 bgcolor=#E9E9E9
| 187990 ||  || — || September 12, 2001 || Socorro || LINEAR || — || align=right | 2.1 km || 
|-id=991 bgcolor=#fefefe
| 187991 ||  || — || September 12, 2001 || Socorro || LINEAR || — || align=right | 1.3 km || 
|-id=992 bgcolor=#fefefe
| 187992 ||  || — || September 16, 2001 || Socorro || LINEAR || NYS || align=right data-sort-value="0.85" | 850 m || 
|-id=993 bgcolor=#fefefe
| 187993 ||  || — || September 16, 2001 || Socorro || LINEAR || ERI || align=right | 2.7 km || 
|-id=994 bgcolor=#E9E9E9
| 187994 ||  || — || September 17, 2001 || Socorro || LINEAR || — || align=right | 1.9 km || 
|-id=995 bgcolor=#E9E9E9
| 187995 ||  || — || September 17, 2001 || Socorro || LINEAR || — || align=right | 2.5 km || 
|-id=996 bgcolor=#fefefe
| 187996 ||  || — || September 17, 2001 || Socorro || LINEAR || NYS || align=right data-sort-value="0.89" | 890 m || 
|-id=997 bgcolor=#E9E9E9
| 187997 ||  || — || September 17, 2001 || Socorro || LINEAR || EUN || align=right | 1.5 km || 
|-id=998 bgcolor=#E9E9E9
| 187998 ||  || — || September 16, 2001 || Socorro || LINEAR || — || align=right | 1.6 km || 
|-id=999 bgcolor=#fefefe
| 187999 ||  || — || September 19, 2001 || Socorro || LINEAR || — || align=right data-sort-value="0.93" | 930 m || 
|-id=000 bgcolor=#E9E9E9
| 188000 ||  || — || September 19, 2001 || Socorro || LINEAR || — || align=right | 1.2 km || 
|}

References

External links 
 Discovery Circumstances: Numbered Minor Planets (185001)–(190000) (IAU Minor Planet Center)

0187